= List of Indian football first tier top scorers =

The top tier in Indian football league system is the Indian Super League, replacing the I-League from the 2022–23 season. The list includes records from the National Football League or the I-League (1996–97 – 2021–22) and the Indian Super League (2017–18 – present).

== Top scorers ==
=== By season ===
Key
**Player (X)**	Name of the player and number of times they were top scorer at that point (if more than one)
^{†}	Indicates multiple top scorers in the same season
§	Denotes the club was Indian champion in the same season

Season	Player(s)	Nationality	Club(s)	Goals
1996–97	Bhaichung Bhutia	India	JCT^{§}	14
1997–98	Raman Vijayan	India	Kochin	10
1998–99	Philip Mensah	Ghana	Churchill Brothers	11
1999–2000	Igor Shkvyrin	Uzbekistan	Mohun Bagan^{§}	11
2000–01	José Barreto	Brazil	Mohun Bagan	14
2001–02	Yusif Yakubu	Ghana	Churchill Brothers	18
2002–03	Yusif Yakubu (2)	Ghana	Churchill Brothers	21
2003–04	Cristiano Júnior	Brazil	East Bengal^{§}	15
2004–05	Dudu Omagbemi	Nigeria	Sporting Goa	21
2005–06	Ranti Martins	Nigeria	Dempo	13
2006–07	Odafa Onyeka Okolie	Nigeria	Churchill Brothers	18
2007–08	Odafa Onyeka Okolie (2)	Nigeria	Churchill Brothers	22
2008–09	Odafa Onyeka Okolie (3)	Nigeria	Churchill Brothers^{§}	24
2009–10	Odafa Onyeka Okolie (4)	Nigeria	Churchill Brothers	21
2010–11	Ranti Martins (2)	Nigeria	Dempo	28
2011–12	Ranti Martins (3)	Nigeria	Dempo^{§}	32
2012–13	Ranti Martins (4)	Nigeria	Prayag United	27
2013–14^{†}	Sunil Chhetri	India	Bengaluru^{§}	14
2013–14^{†}	Darryl Duffy	Scotland	Salgaocar	14
2013–14^{†}	Cornell Glen	Trinidad and Tobago	Shillong Lajong	14
2014–15	Ranti Martins (5)	Nigeria	East Bengal	17
2015–16	Ranti Martins (6)	Nigeria	East Bengal	12
2016–17	Aser Pierrick Dipanda	Cameroon	Shillong Lajong	11
2017–18	Coro	Spain	Goa	18
2018–19^{†}	Pedro Manzi	Spain	Chennai City^{§}	21
2018–19^{†}	Willis Plaza	Trinidad and Tobago	Churchill Brothers	21
2019–20^{†}	Roy Krishna	Fiji	ATK^{§}	15
2019–20^{†}	Nerijus Valskis	Lithuania	Chennaiyin	15
2019–20^{†}	Bartholomew Ogbeche	Nigeria	Kerala Blasters	15
2020–21^{†}	Roy Krishna (2)	Fiji	Mohun Bagan	14
2020–21^{†}	Igor Angulo	Spain	Goa	14
2021–22	Bartholomew Ogbeche (2)	Nigeria	Hyderabad^{§}	18
2022–23^{†}	Diego Maurício	Brazil	Odisha	12
2022–23^{†}	Cleiton Silva	Brazil	East Bengal	12
2022–23^{†}	Dimitri Petratos	Australia	Mohun Bagan	12
2023–24^{†}	Dimitrios Diamantakos	Greece	Kerala Blasters	13
2023–24^{†}	Roy Krishna	Fiji	Odisha	13
2024–25	Alaaeddine Ajaraie	Morocco	NorthEast United	23
2025–26	Youssef Ezzejjari	Spain	East Bengal^{§}	11

=== By number of seasons as top scorer ===
Rank	Player	Titles	Club(s)	Years
1	(Nigeria) Ranti Martins	6	Dempo, Prayag United, East Bengal	2005–06; 2010–11; 2011–12; 2012–13; 2014–15; 2015–16
2	(Nigeria) Odafa Onyeka Okolie	4	Churchill Brothers	2006–07; 2007–08; 2008–09; 2009–10
3	(Fiji) Roy Krishna	3	ATK, Mohun Bagan, Odisha	2019–20; 2020–21; 2023–24
3	(Ghana) Yusif Yakubu	2	Churchill Brothers	2001–02; 2002–03
3	(Nigeria) Bartholomew Ogbeche	2	Kerala Blasters, Hyderabad	2019–20; 2021–22
4	(India) Bhaichung Bhutia	1	JCT	1996–97
4	(India) Raman Vijayan	1	Kochin	1997–98
4	(Ghana) Philip Mensah	1	Churchill Brothers	1998–99
4	(Uzbekistan) Igor Shkvyrin	1	Mohun Bagan	1999–2000
4	(Brazil) José Barreto	1	Mohun Bagan	2000–01
4	(Brazil) Cristiano Júnior	1	East Bengal	2003–04
4	(Nigeria) Dudu Omagbemi	1	Sporting Goa	2004–05
4	(India) **Sunil Chhetri**	1	Bengaluru	2013–14
4	(Scotland) Darryl Duffy	1	Salgaocar	2013–14
4	(Trinidad and Tobago) Cornell Glen	1	Shillong Lajong	2013–14
4	(Cameroon) Aser Pierrick Dipanda	1	Shillong Lajong	2016–17
4	(Spain) Coro	1	Goa	2017–18
4	(Spain) Pedro Manzi	1	Chennai City	2018–19
4	(Trinidad and Tobago) Willis Plaza	1	Churchill Brothers	2018–19
4	(Lithuania) Nerijus Valskis	1	Chennaiyin	2019–20
4	(Brazil) Diego Maurício	1	Odisha	2022–23
4	(Brazil) Cleiton Silva	1	East Bengal	2022–23
4	(Australia) **Dimitri Petratos**	1	Mohun Bagan	2022–23
4	(Greece) Dimitrios Diamantakos	1	Kerala Blasters	2023–24
4	(Morocco) **Alaaeddine Ajaraie**	1	Northeast United	2024–25
4	(Spain) **Youssef Ezzejjari**	1	East Bengal	2025–26

- **Bold** denotes players currently playing in the Indian Super League.

=== By club ===
Rank	Club	Titles	Seasons
1	Churchill Brothers	8	1998–99, 2001–02, 2002–03, 2006–07, 2007–08, 2008–09, 2009–10, 2018–19
2	East Bengal	5	2003–04, 2014–15, 2015–16, 2022–23, 2025–26
3	Mohun Bagan	4	1999–2000, 2000–01, 2020–21, 2022–23
4	Dempo	3	2005–06, 2010–11, 2011–12
5	Shillong Lajong	2	2013–14, 2016–17
5	Kerala Blasters	2	2019–20, 2023–24
5	Goa	2	2017–18, 2020–21
8	JCT	1	1996–97
8	Kochin	1	1997–99
8	Sporting Goa	1	2004–05
8	Prayag United	1	2012–13
8	Bengaluru	1	2013–14
8	Salgaocar	1	2013–14
8	Chennai City	1	2018–19
8	ATK	1	2019–20
8	Chennaiyin	1	2019–20
8	Hyderabad	1	2020–21
8	Odisha	1	2022–23
8	NorthEast United	1	2024–25

=== By nationality ===
Country	Titles
Nigeria	13
Brazil	4
Spain	4
India	3
Ghana	3
Trinidad and Tobago	2
Fiji	2
Uzbekistan	1
Scotland	1
Cameroon	1
Lithuania	1
Australia	1
Greece	1
Morocco	1

== All-time top scorers with over 50 goals ==
Rank	Player	Years	Goals	Apps	Ratio	Club goals/Appearances
1	(Nigeria) Ranti Martins	2004–2016	214	248	0.86	Dempo 146/164 - Prayag United 31/40 - Rangdajied United 8/8 - East Bengal 29/36
2	(Nigeria) Odafa Onyeka Okolie	2003–2018	179	—	—	Mohammedan 1 - Churchill Brothers 113/106 - Mohun Bagan 51/60 - Sporting Goa 14/23 - Gokulam Kerala 0/3
3	(India) **Sunil Chhetri**	2002–	164	377	0.44	Mohun Bagan 16/32 - JCT 22/48 - East Bengal 9/17 - Dempo 8/13 - Chirag United 7/7 - Churchill Brothers 4/8 - Bengaluru 98/252
4	(Ghana) Yusif Yakubu	2001–2014	147	—	—	Churchill Brothers 65/103 - Mahindra United 17 - East Bengal 20 - Salgaocar 15 - Prayag United 12 - Mumbai 18
5	(Nigeria) Chidi Edeh	2003–2014	104	217	0.48	Mohammedan 4/19 - Sporting Goa 15/37 - JCT 12/16 - Dempo 8/15 - Mahindra United 11/22 - Mohun Bagan 21/39 - Salgaocar 6/21 - East Bengal 27/48
6	(Brazil) Jose Ramirez Barreto	1999–2012	101	—	—	Mohun Bagan 94 - Mahindra United 7
7	(India) Bhaichung Bhutia	1996–2013	89	—	—	East Bengal 49 - JCT 15 - Mohun Bagan 25
8	(Nigeria) Bartholomew Ogbeche	2018–2023	63	98	0.64	NorthEast United 12/18 - Kerala Blasters 15/16 - Mumbai City 8/23 - Hyderabad 28/41
9	(Cameroon) Aser Pierrick Dipanda	2015–2022	59	107	0.55	DSK Shivajians 7/13 - Shillong Lajong 11/17 - Mohun Bagan 21/38 - Minerva Punjab 12/16 - Real Kashmir 4/10 - Aizawl 4/13
10	(Fiji) Roy Krishna	2019–2025	58	116	0.5	ATK 15/21 - Mohun Bagan SG 21/39 - Bengaluru 6/22 - Odisha 16/34
11	(India) Jeje Lalpekhlua	2009–2021	51	171	0.3	Pune 12/52 - Pailan Arrows 13/15 - Dempo 5/18 - Chennaiyin 10/36 - Mohun Bagan 4/10 - Aizawl 10/43 - East Bengal 1/7
12	(India) **Lallianzuala Chhangte**	2017–present	50	180	0.28	Delhi Dynamos 8/36 - Chennaiyin 12/53 - Mumbai City 30/91

- **Bold** denotes players currently playing in the Indian Super League.

== Clubs top scorer in top tier ==
Club	Player	Goals	Years
Aizawl	(Liberia) Ansumana Kromah	9	2018–2019
ATK	(Fiji) Roy Krishna	15	2019–2020
Bengaluru	(India) Sunil Chhetri	98	2013–present
Chennai City	(Spain) Pedro Manzi	22	2018–2019
Chennaiyin	(Lithuania) Nerijus Valskis	17	2019–2022
Churchill Brothers	(Nigeria) Odafa Onyeka Okolie	113	2005–2011
Dempo	(Nigeria) Ranti Martins	146	2004–2012
DSK Shivajians	(Cameroon) Aser Pierrick Dipanda	7	2015–2016
East Bengal	(India) Bhaichung Bhutia	49	1997–2011
Goa	(Spain) Coro	48	2017–2020
Gokulam Kerala	(Trinidad and Tobago) Marcus Joseph	14	2019–2020
Hyderabad	(Nigeria) Bartholomew Ogbeche	28	2021–2023
Jamshedpur	(Nigeria) Daniel Chima Chukwu	18	2021–present
Kerala Blasters	(Greece) Dimitrios Diamantakos	23	2022–2024
Minerva Punjab	(Cameroon) Aser Pierrick Dipanda	12	2019–2020
Mohun Bagan	(Brazil) José Barreto	94	1999–2012
Mumbai City	(India) Lallianzuala Chhangte	30	2022–present
NEROCA	(Nigeria) Felix Chidi Odili	24	2017–2019
NorthEast United	(Morocco) Alaaeddine Ajaraie	23	2024–present
Odisha	(Brazil) Diego Maurício	32	2020–2025
Punjab	(Slovenia) Luka Majcen	18	2022–2025
Real Kashmir	(Scotland) Mason Robertson	25	2018–2022
Shillong Lajong	(Trinidad and Tobago) Cornell Glen	30	2013–2016
Sreenidi Deccan	(Colombia) David Castañeda	10	2021–2022
TRAU	(India) Bidyashagar Singh	12	2020–2021
United SC	(Nigeria) Ranti Martins	31	2012–2014

== Top Indian scorers ==
Rank	Player	Span	Goals
1	**Sunil Chhetri**	2002–	164
2	Bhaichung Bhutia	1996–2013	89
3	Jeje Lalpekhlua	2009–2021	51
4	**Lallianzuala Chhangte**	2016–	50
5	Ashim Biswas	2003–2018	42
6	Abhishek Yadav	1999–2015	40
7	Robin Singh	2010–2022	39
8	R. C. Prakash	2000–2012	38
9	Raman Vijayan	1996–2003	37
9	Balwant Singh	2008–2022	37
9	Francis Silveira	1996–2001	37

- **Bold** denotes players currently playing in the Indian Super League.

== Records ==
All records listed below pertain to league matches played in the National Football League, I-League (2006–07 to 2021–22) and the Indian Super League (2017–18 to present) only.

- Most goals in a season: 32 Ranti Martins, Dempo (2011–12)
- Most goals in a season by an Indian: 14
  - Bhaichung Bhutia, JCT (1996–97)
  - Mohammed Rafi, Mahindra United (2009–10)
  - Sunil Chhetri, Bengaluru (2013–14, 2017–18)
- Most individual goals in a match: 6 Ranti Martins for Dempo v. Air India 30 May 2011
- Fastest goal in a match: 9 seconds Komron Tursunov for TRAU v. Real Kashmir 10 January 2021
- Most number of hat-tricks: Odafa Onyeka Okolie (13)
- First ever goal scorer: Raman Vijayan for East Bengal v. Mohammedan Sporting 17 December 1996
- First ever golden boot winner: Bhaichung Bhutia, 14 goals for JCT in 1996–97 season
- Youngest ever goal scorer: Rohit Danu 16 years, 5 months and 27 days for Indian Arrows v. Aizwal 5 January 2019
- Youngest ever hat-trick scorer: Bungo Singh 18 years and 3 days for Air India v. SBT 5 March 2001

== See also ==
- Indian Super League Golden Boot
- I-League Golden Boot
- List of Indian Super League records and statistics
- List of I-League records and statistics
