= East Bengal FC league record by opponent =

East Bengal Football Club is an Indian association football club based in Kolkata, West Bengal, which competes in the top tier of Indian football, for the 2022–23 season. The club was formed when the vice-president of Jorabagan, Suresh Chandra Chaudhuri, resigned when Jorabagan sent out their starting eleven but with the notable exclusion of defender Sailesh Bose who was dropped from the squad for reasons not disclosed when they were about to face Mohun Bagan in the Coochbehar Cup Semi-Final on 28 July 1920. He along with Raja Manmatha Nath Chaudhuri, Ramesh Chandra Sen, and Aurobinda Ghosh, formed East Bengal, in the Jorabagan home of Suresh Chandra on 1 August 1920; 99 years ago. East Bengal started playing in the Calcutta Football League 2nd division from 1921 and in 1925 they qualified for the first division for the first time and since then they have won numerous titles in Indian Football.

East Bengal joined the National Football League since its inception in 1996 and is the only club to play all seasons till date, even after its name change to I-League in 2007. East Bengal have won the National Football League thrice: 2000–01, 2002–03 and 2003–04 and became runners up 7 times, the most number of times by any Indian football club. Among other trophies, East Bengal has won the Calcutta Football League 39 times, the IFA Shield 29 times, the Federation Cup 8 times and the Durand Cup 16 times.

The team that East Bengal have met the most in I-League (formerly National Football League) competition is Mohun Bagan, their arch-rivals, against whom they have contested 45 league matches having won 16 of these; Mohun Bagan are the side against whom East Bengal has won the most in league competition. Churchill Brothers have recorded the most league victories over East Bengal, with 16 wins in 42 matches.

In 2020–21 season, East Bengal moved into the Indian Super League, the officially declared new top tier league of Indian football, after a successful bid process. They finished ninth in their debut season, having won three of the twenty league matches. The team finished eleventh, at the bottom in the 2021–22 season, winning just one game in the entire campaign. In the 2022–23 season, East Bengal finished ninth again, having won six of the twenty league matches.

== All-time league record ==
Keys
The symbols and colours used below:
- The records include the results of matches played in the:
  - National Football League (from 1996 to 2006)
  - I-League (from 2006 to 2020)
  - Indian Super League (from 2020 to present day)
- For the sake of simplicity, present-day names are used throughout: for example, results against ATK Mohun Bagan, Chirag United, Mahindra, and Pailan Arrows are integrated into the records against Mohun Bagan SG, United S.C., Mahindra United and Indian Arrows, respectively.
- The season given as the "first" denotes the season in which East Bengal first played a league match against that team.
- The season given as the "last" denotes the season in which East Bengal last played a league match against that team.
- † Teams with this background and symbol in the "Club" column are current divisional rivals of East Bengal FC.
- ‡ Clubs with this background and symbol in the "Club" column are defunct.
- P = matches played; W = matches won; D = matches drawn; L = matches lost; Win% = percentage of total matches won.

=== Indian Super League ===
==== League record by ISL season ====
As of 20 November 2026

East Bengal league record in ISL
Season	Played	Won	Draw	Loss	GF	GA	GD	Points	Position	Play-offs	Ref
2020–21	20	3	8	9	22	33	−11	17	9th	Did not qualify	
2021–22	20	1	8	11	18	36	−18	11	11th	Did not qualify	
2022–23	20	6	1	13	22	38	−16	19	9th	Did not qualify	
2023–24	22	6	6	10	27	29	−2	24	9th	Did not qualify	
2024–25	24	8	4	12	27	33	-6	28	9th	Did not qualify	
2025–26	13	7	5	1	30	11	+19	26	Champions	Not Held	
2026–27	4	2	1	1	14	8	+6	7	5th	To be decided	
TOTAL	123	33	33	57	160	186	−32	132			

==== League record by opponents ====
As of 20 November 2026

East Bengal league record by opponents: ISL
Club	Home						Away						Total						Win%	First	Last	Notes	Ref
Club	P	W	D	L	F	A	P	W	D	L	F	A	P	W	D	L	F	A	Win%	First	Last	Notes	Ref
Bengaluru †	6	2	2	2	8	9	5	2	1	2	4	4	11	4	3	4	12	13	36.36	2020–21	2025–26	(Note: Due to the COVID-19 pandemic in India, the 2020–21 and 2021–22 Indian Super League season was held entirely in Goa, inside closed doors and East Bengal was allotted the Tilak Maidan Stadium as their home ground for both the seasons.) (Note: A single legged 2025–26 season was announced with no playoffs due to delays with restructuring of the league.)	
Chennaiyin †	5	1	2	2	5	8	7	2	3	2	9	9	12	3	5	4	14	17	25.00	2020–21	2026–27		
Churchill Brothers †	0	0	0	0	0	0	1	1	0	0	4	0	1	1	0	0	4	0	100.00	2026–27	2026–27		
Goa †	6	0	2	4	8	12	5	1	1	3	5	8	11	1	3	7	13	20	9.09	2020–21	2025–26	(Note: In 2023–24, the home match against Goa was shifted to Bhubaneshwar due to administrative issues.)	
Inter Kashi †	0	0	0	0	0	0	2	2	0	0	7	2	2	2	0	0	7	2	100.00	2025–26	2026–27		
Jamshedpur ‡	6	1	3	2	4	5	5	2	0	3	6	7	11	3	3	5	10	12	27.27	2020–21	2025–26		
Kerala Blasters †	6	2	3	1	7	6	5	1	1	3	7	9	11	3	4	4	14	15	27.27	2020–21	2025–26		
Mohammedan SC †	2	1	1	0	7	0	1	1	0	0	3	1	3	2	1	0	10	1	66.67	2024–25	2025–26		
Mohun Bagan †	5	0	0	5	1	12	6	0	2	4	5	12	11	0	2	9	6	24	0.00	2020–21	2025–26	(Note: In 2024–25, the away match against Mohun Bagan Super Giants was shifted to Guwahati due to administrative issues.)	
Mumbai City †	5	0	1	4	2	8	6	2	2	2	3	5	11	2	3	6	5	13	18.18	2020–21	2025–26		
NorthEast United †	6	3	2	1	14	6	5	1	0	4	5	12	11	4	2	5	19	17	36.36	2020–21	2025–26		
Odisha †	6	2	1	3	10	9	5	0	0	5	12	19	11	2	1	8	22	28	18.18	2020–21	2025–26	(Note: In 2025–26, the home match against Odisha was shifted to Goa due to Bengal elections.)	
Punjab †	3	1	2	0	4	2	2	1	0	1	4	5	5	2	2	1	8	7	40.00	2023–24	2025–26		
SC Delhi (Note: Hyderabad rebranded themselves as SC Delhi hence the records are accumulated into one.) †	7	3	2	2	11	11	5	1	2	2	5	7	12	4	4	4	16	18	33.33	2020–21	2026–27		

==== Overall record in ISL ====
As of 20 November 2026

East Bengal overall league record in ISL
Competition	Home						Away						Total							
Competition	P	W	D	L	F	A	P	W	D	L	F	A	P	W	D	L	F	A	Win%	Notes
Indian Super League (2020–present) (Tier-One)	63	16	21	26	81	88	60	17	12	31	79	100	123	33	33	57	160	188	26.83	

=== National Football League/I-League ===
==== League record by NFL/I-League season ====
As of the end of 2019–20 season.

East Bengal league record in NFL/I-League
Season	Played	Won	Draw	Loss	GF	GA	GD	Points	Position	Ref
1996–97	5 (Note: Group Stage)	3	2	0	6	2	+4	11	Qualified for Championship stage	
1996–97	14	7	4	3	19	11	+8	25	3rd	
1997–98	18	8	7	3	18	10	+8	31	2nd	
1998–99	10 (Note: First Stage)	8	2	0	19	2	+17	26	Qualified for Second Stage	
1998–99	10	5	4	1	14	8	+6	19	2nd	
1999–00	22	8	8	6	25	21	+4	32	7th	
2000–01	22	13	7	2	30	9	+21	46	Champions	
2001–02	22	11	3	8	31	23	+8	36	5th	
2002–03	22	15	4	3	44	22	+22	49	Champions	
2003–04	22	15	4	3	37	13	+24	49	Champions	
2004–05	22	13	4	5	34	16	+18	43	3rd	
2005–06	17	9	4	4	25	16	+9	31	2nd	
2006–07	18	7	5	6	29	29	0	26	5th	
2007–08	18	5	4	9	17	23	−6	19	6th	
2008–09	22	7	7	8	31	26	+5	28	6th	
2009–10	26	7	10	9	27	31	−4	31	9th	
2010–11	26	15	6	5	44	21	+23	51	2nd	
2011–12	26	15	6	5	46	22	+24	51	2nd	
2012–13	26	13	8	5	44	18	+26	47	3rd	
2013–14	24	12	7	5	39	23	+16	43	2nd	
2014–15	20	8	5	7	30	28	+2	29	4th	
2015–16	16	7	4	5	22	18	+4	25	3rd	
2016–17	18	10	3	5	33	15	+18	33	3rd	
2017–18	18	8	7	3	32	19	+13	31	4th	
2018–19	20	13	3	4	37	20	+17	42	2nd	
2019–20	16	6	5	5	23	18	+4	20	cancelled (Note: The 2019–20 I-League was cancelled after 16 Rounds due to the COVID-19 pandemic. East Bengal FC was in second place when the league was cancelled.)	
TOTAL	500	248	133	119	756	464	+292	877		

==== League record by opponents ====
Statistics correct till end of 2019–20 I-League.

East Bengal league record by opponent
Club	Home				Away				Total						Win%	First	Last	Notes	Refs
Club	P	W	D	L	P	W	D	L	P	W	D	L	F	A	Win%	First	Last	Notes	Refs
Air India ‡	11	6	4	1	11	5	3	3	22	11	7	4	33	17	50.00	1996–97	2012–13		
Aizawl	5	1	3	1	4	1	1	2	9	2	4	3	11	11	22.22	2015–16	2019–20	(Note: The 2019–20 I-League was cancelled after 16 Rounds due to the COVID-19 pandemic. The return leg match was cancelled.)	
Bengaluru	4	3	0	1	4	2	0	2	8	5	0	3	11	9	62.50	2013–14	2016–17		
Bharat ‡	1	0	1	0	1	1	0	0	2	1	1	0	4	1	50.00	2014–15	2014–15		
Border Security Forces ‡	1	1	0	0	1	1	0	0	2	2	0	0	4	1	100.00	1999–00	1999–00		
Chennai City	3	2	0	1	4	2	0	2	7	4	0	3	17	8	57.14	2016–17	2019–20		
Churchill Brothers	21	9	6	6	21	5	6	10	42	14	12	16	53	52	33.33	1996–97	2019–20	(Note: Includes a 3–0 Walkover win in 1997–98 for East Bengal FC as Churchill Brothers refused to play due to disputes over Match ball.)	
Dempo	16	9	5	2	16	3	7	6	32	12	12	8	52	44	37.50	1996–97	2014–15		
DSK Shivajians ‡	2	1	0	1	2	1	0	1	4	2	0	2	3	4	50.00	2015–16	2016–17		
Kochin ‡	6	3	3	0	6	4	1	1	12	7	4	1	21	11	58.33	1997–98	2001–02	(Note: Includes 2 matches from 1998–99 Preliminary Stages.)	
Fransa-Pax ‡	2	1	0	1	1	0	1	0	3	1	1	1	2	1	33.33	2004–05	2005–06		
Gokulam Kerala	3	2	0	1	3	1	1	1	6	3	1	2	9	8	50.00	2017–18	2019–20		
HAL ‡	5	5	0	0	5	3	1	1	10	8	1	1	31	10	80.00	2001–02	2011–12		
Indian Arrows	6	5	0	1	6	4	2	0	12	9	2	1	23	6	75.00	2010–11	2019–20		
Indian Bank ‡	6	4	2	0	5	3	2	0	11	7	4	0	19	5	63.64	1996–97	2003–04	(Note: Includes 1 match from 1996–97 First Stage which East Bengal won 1–0.)	
ITI ‡	6	5	0	1	5	2	2	1	11	7	2	2	15	6	63.64	1996–97	2002–03	(Note: Includes 1 match from 1996–97 First Stage which East Bengal won 2–0.)	
JCT Mills ‡	15	9	4	2	16	6	5	5	31	15	9	7	32	23	48.39	1996–97	2010–11	(Note: Includes 1 match from 1996–97 First Stage which ended 1–1.)	
Mahindra United ‡	14	9	4	1	14	4	3	7	28	13	7	8	33	22	46.43	1996–97	2009–10		
Minerva Punjab	4	1	2	1	4	3	1	0	8	4	3	1	14	6	50.00	2016–17	2019–20		
Mohammedan	6	5	1	0	5	4	1	0	11	9	2	0	23	7	81.82	1996–97	2013–14	(Note: Includes 1 match from 1996–97 First Stage which East Bengal won 2–1.)	
Mohun Bagan	22	11	7	4	23	6	6	11	45	17	13	15	50	42	37.78	1997–98	2019–20	(Note: Includes a 3–0 Walkover win in 2012–13 for East Bengal as Mohun Bagan refused to play in the second half citing crowd violence.)	
Mumbai ‡	9	4	3	2	9	2	3	4	18	6	6	6	28	20	33.33	2008–09	2016–17		
NEROCA	2	1	1	0	3	2	1	0	5	3	2	0	10	4	60.00	2017–18	2019–20		
ONGC‡	2	2	0	0	2	0	0	2	4	2	0	2	6	2	50.00	2010–11	2012–13		
Pune‡	6	4	0	2	6	3	2	1	12	7	2	3	18	12	58.33	2009–10	2014–15		
Punjab Police ‡	1	1	0	0	1	1	0	0	2	2	0	0	6	2	100.00	2001–02	2001–02		
Rangdajied United	1	1	0	0	1	1	0	0	2	2	0	0	5	2	100.00	2013–14	2013–14		
Real Kashmir	2	0	2	0	2	2	0	0	4	2	2	0	5	3	50.00	2018–19	2019–20		
Royal Wahingdoh	1	1	0	0	1	0	0	1	2	1	0	1	2	1	50.00	2014–15	2014–15		
Salgaocar	20	13	6	1	19	2	5	12	39	15	11	13	43	46	38.46	1996–97	2015–16	(Note: Includes 1 match from 1996–97 First Stage which ended 0–0.)	
State Bank of Travancore	3	3	0	0	3	2	1	0	6	5	1	0	16	5	83.33	1999–00	2004–05		
Shillong Lajong	9	6	2	1	9	3	2	4	18	9	4	5	35	17	50.00	2009–10	2018–19		
Sporting CG	12	5	5	2	12	5	5	2	24	10	10	4	35	26	41.67	2003–04	2015–16		
Tollygunge Agragami	6	4	0	2	6	5	1	0	12	9	1	2	21	4	75.00	1999–00	2004–05		
TRAU	1	1	0	0	1	1	0	0	2	2	0	0	6	3	100.00	2019–20	2019–20		
United	6	3	1	2	6	1	4	1	12	4	5	3	14	10	33.33	2008–09	2013–14		
United Sikkim ‡	1	1	0	0	1	1	0	0	2	2	0	0	7	0	100.00	2012–13	2012–13		
Vasco	6	4	0	2	6	3	3	0	12	7	3	2	22	8	58.33	2000–01	2008–09		
Viva Kerala ‡	4	3	1	0	4	4	0	0	8	7	1	0	17	5	87.50	2007–08	2011–12		

==== Overall record ====
Statistics correct till end of 2019–20 I-League.

East Bengal overall league record in NFL/I-League
Competition	Home				Away				Total							
Competition	P	W	D	L	P	W	D	L	P	W	D	L	F	A	Win%	Notes
National Football League (1996–2007) (Tier-One)	114	77	25	12	110	45	33	32	224	122	58	44	331	182	54.46	(Note: Includes 5 matches from 1996–97 NFL First Stage and 10 matches from 1998–99 NFL Preliminary Stages.)
I-League (2007–2020) (Tier-One)	137	72	38	27	139	54	37	48	276	126	75	75	425	282	45.65	
Total	251	149	63	39	249	99	70	80	500	248	133	119	756	464	49.60	

== See also ==
- Indian Super League
- I-League
- National Football League
