= List of Churchill Brothers FC seasons =

Churchill Brothers FC is an Indian professional association football club based in Margao, Goa. The club was formed in 1988.

Churchill Brothers have won the I-League twice, and the Federation Cup once.

== Key ==
- P = Played
- W = Games won
- D = Games drawn
- L = Games lost
- F = Goals for
- A = Goals against
- Pts = Points
- Pos = Final position
- Div 1 = National Football League
- Div 2 = National Football League Second Division
- IL = I-League
- F = Final
- Group = Group stage
- R16 = Round of 16
- QF = Quarter-finals
- SF = Semi-finals
- QR3 = Qualifying Round 3
- R1 = Round 1
- R2 = Round 2
- R3 = Round 3
- R4 = Round 4
- R5 = Round 5
- R6 = Round 6

1st or W	Winners
2nd or RU	Runners-up
↑	Promoted
↓	Relegated
♦	Top scorer in division

== Seasons ==
Results of league and cup competitions by season
Season	Division	P	W	D	L	F	A	Pts	Pos	Federation Cup	Super Cup	Asia	Round reached	Name	Goals
Season	League									Federation Cup	Super Cup	Asia	Round reached	Top goalscorer	
1996–97	Div 1	19	10	6	3	27	16	39	2nd	—	—	—	—	—	—
1997–98	Div 1	18	4	7	7	20	26	19	9th	QF	—	Asian Club Championship	R1	—	—
1998–99	Div 1	20	7	8	5	27	22	29	3rd	SF	—	—	—	—	—
1999–2000	Div 1	22	12	5	5	36	17	41	2nd	Not held	—	—	—	—	—
2000–01	Div 1	22	10	6	6	32	25	36	3rd	Not held	—	—	—	—	—
2001–02	Div 1	22	12	6	4	44	19	42	2nd	QF	—	—	—	(Ghana) Yusif Yakubu ♦	18
2002–03	Div 1	22	10	7	5	33	22	37	5th	Not held	—	AFC; Champions; League	QR3	(Ghana) Yusif Yakubu ♦	21
2003–04	Div 1	22	10	6	6	29	24	36	4th	R16	—	—	—	(Ghana) Yusif Yakubu	14
2004–05	Div 1	22	5	8	9	23	33	23	9th ▼	—	—	—	—	—	—
2005–06	Div 2	10	6	2	2	20	7	20	2nd ▲	—	—	—	—	—	—
2006–07	Div 1	18	7	8	3	30	23	29	4th	—	—	—	—	(Nigeria) Odafe Onyeka Okolie ♦	18
2007–08	IL	18	11	3	4	40	22	36	2nd	QF	—	—	—	(Nigeria) Odafe Onyeka Okolie ♦	22
2008–09	IL	22	13	7	2	53	23	46	1st	SF	—	—	—	(Nigeria) Odafe Onyeka Okolie ♦	24
2009–10	IL	26	11	10	5	51	35	43	2nd	SF	—	AFC Cup	R16	(Nigeria) Odafe Onyeka Okolie ♦	22
2010–11	IL	26	14	8	4	57	31	50	4th	SF	—	—	—	(Nigeria) Odafe Onyeka Okolie	25
2011–12	IL	26	14	6	6	47	28	48	3rd	GS	—	—	—	(Gabon) Henry Antchouet	18
2012–13	IL	26	16	7	3	56	22	55	1st	SF	—	AFC Cup	GS	(Gabon) Henry Antchouet	14
2013–14	IL	24	6	7	11	25	37	25	12th	W	—	AFC Cup	R16	(India) Balwant Singh	10
2014–15	Excluded from I-league														
2015–16	Excluded from I-league														
2016–17	IL	18	5	5	8	24	26	20	6th	GS	—	—	—	(Liberia) Ansumana Kromah	6
2017–18	IL	18	5	2	11	17	28	17	9th	R16	—	—	—	(Ivory Coast) Mechac Koffi	4
2018–19	IL	20	9	7	4	35	23	34	4th	Withdrew	–	–	–	(Trinidad and Tobago) Willis Plaza ♦	21
2019–20	IL	15	6	2	7	23	21	20	8th	Not held	–	–	–	(Trinidad and Tobago) Willis Plaza	8
2020–21	IL	15	8	5	2	22	17	29	2nd	Not held	—	—	—	(Slovenia) Luka Majcen	11
2021–22	IL	18	9	3	6	24	22	30	4th	Not held	–	–	–	(Nigeria) Kenneth Ikechukwu	10
2022–23	IL	22	9	6	7	34	24	33	6th	GS	–	–	–	(Senegal) Abdoulaye Sané	7
2023–24	IL	24	9	6	9	40	31	33	7th	–	–	–	–	(Nigeria) Ogana Louis	7
2024–25	IL	22	11	7	4	45	25	40	2nd	Withdrew	–	–	–		
2025–26	IFL	Withdrew from whole season													
2026–27	ISL														
