= List of Mohun Bagan Super Giant seasons =

Mohun Bagan Super Giant commonly referred to as Mohun Bagan (Football Department of Mohun Bagan AC) is an Indian association football club based in Kolkata, West Bengal. Founded in 1889, it is one of the oldest football clubs in Asia. The club competes in the Indian Super League, the top tier of Indian football league system.

Mohun Bagan have won the National Football League thrice, the I-League twice, the Indian Super League twice. They are the most successful team in the history of the Federation Cup having won it fourteen times.

== Key ==
- P = Played
- W = Games won
- D = Games drawn
- L = Games lost
- F = Goals for
- A = Goals against
- Pts = Points
- Pos = Final position
- NFL = National Football League
- IL = I-League
- ISL = Indian Super League
- R1 = Round 1
- R2 = Round 2
- R3 = Round 3
- R4 = Round 4
- R5 = Round 5
- R6 = Round 6
- Group = Group stage
- R16 = Round of 16
- QF = Quarter-finals
- SF = Semi-finals
- F = Final

1st or W	Winners
2nd or RU	Runners-up
↑	Promoted
↓	Relegated
♦	Top scorer in division

== Seasons ==
Note: The club's competitive record only since 1996, when the first national-level league was incepted, is listed below.

Season	National Football League (till 2007) I-League (2007–2020) Indian Super League (2020– )								ISL Play–Offs (2020–)	Federation Cup (till 2017) Super Cup (2018–)	Durand Cup	Asian club competition		Calcutta Premier Division	Other major honours
Season	Pos	Pl	W	D	L	GF	GA	Pts.	ISL Play–Offs (2020–)	Federation Cup (till 2017) Super Cup (2018–)	Durand Cup	Asian club competition		Calcutta Premier Division	Other major honours
1996–97	5th (Note: Mohun Bagan originally finished the season in the relegation zone, but the decision to relegate was repelled later.) of 6 (First phase)	5	1	3	1	6	5	6	N/A	Quarterfinalists	DNP	DNQ		2nd	Bordoloi Trophy
1997–98	1st	18	9	6	2	20	10	34	N/A	Semifinalists	Runners-up	DNQ		1st	
1998–99	4th	20	6	9	5	19	17	27	N/A	Winners	Semifinalists	DNQ		2nd	IFA Shield
1999–00	1st	22	14	5	3	36	17	47	N/A	Cancelled	Semifinalists	Asian Club Championship	Qualifying round 2	2nd	IFA Shield
2000–01	2nd	22	13	6	3	40	19	45	N/A	Cancelled	Winners	DNQ		2nd	Rovers Cup
2001–02	1st	22	13	5	4	31	19	44	N/A	Winners	2nd of 3 (Final group stage)	DNQ		1st	Bordoloi Trophy
2002–03	7th	22	9	6	7	35	25	33	N/A	Semifinalists	DNP	AFC Champions League	Qualifying round 4	3rd	All Airlines Gold Cup
2003–04	9th	22	6	6	10	23	24	24	N/A	Cancelled	DNP	DNQ		2nd	IFA Shield
2004–05	8th	22	5	8	9	16	19	23	N/A	Runners-up	Runners-up	DNQ		2nd	All Airlines Gold Cup
2005–06	3rd	17	8	6	3	17	10	30	N/A	Pre-quarterfinalists	DNP	DNQ		1st	All Airlines Gold Cup
2006–07	8th	18	5	6	7	15	21	21	N/A	Winners	Semifinalists	AFC Cup	2nd of 4 (Group stage)	2nd	Indian Super Cup
2007–08	4th	18	8	6	4	22	17	30	N/A	Semifinalists	DNP	DNQ		1st	
2008–09	2nd	22	13	4	5	30	20	43	N/A	Winners	DNP	AFC Cup	4th of 4 (Group Stage)	1st	Indian Super Cup
2009–10	5th	26	10	6	10	48	43	36	N/A	Semifinalists	Runners-up	DNQ		1st	
2010-11	6th	26	8	10	8	34	32	34	N/A	Runners-up	DNP	DNQ		2nd	
2011–12	4th	26	13	8	5	51	32	47	N/A	4th of 4 (Final Group Phase)	DNP	DNQ		2nd	All Airlines Gold Cup
2012–13	(Note: Mohun Bagan refused to field a side for the second half of a league match due to crowd troubles. For this reason the club was fined and had to start from nil points midway through the season.)10th	26	11	8	7	40	34	29	N/A	2nd of 4 (Final group phase)	DNP	DNQ		2nd	All Airlines Gold Cup
2013–14	8th	24	6	10	8	23	24	28	N/A	Semifinalists	DNP	DNQ		2nd	
2014–15	1st	20	11	6	3	33	16	39	N/A	3rd of 5 (Group stage)	DNP	DNQ		2nd	
2015–16	2nd	16	8	6	2	32	16	30	N/A	Winners	Cancelled	AFC Champions League	Qualifying round 2	3rd	
2015–16	2nd	16	8	6	2	32	16	30	N/A	Winners	Cancelled	AFC Cup	Round of 16	3rd	
2016–17	2nd	18	10	6	2	27	12	36	N/A	Runners-up	DNP	AFC Cup	3rd of 4 (Group stage)	3rd	
2017–18	3rd	18	8	7	3	28	14	31	N/A	Semifinalists	Cancelled	DNQ		2nd	
2018–19	5th	20	8	5	7	27	28	29	N/A	DNP (Note: Super Cup was boycotted by I-League clubs in protest of partiality against them over ISL clubs.)	Cancelled	DNQ		1st	
2019–20	1st	16	12	3	1	35	13	39	N/A	Cancelled	Runners-up	DNQ		2nd	
2020–21	2nd	20	12	4	4	28	15	40	Runners-up	Cancelled	Cancelled	AFC Cup	Inter-zone play-off semifinal	Cancelled	
2021–22	3rd	20	10	7	3	37	26	37	Semifinalists	Cancelled	DNP	AFC Cup	Inter-zone play-off semifinal	DNP	
2022–23	3rd	20	10	4	6	24	17	34	Winners	3rd of 4 (Group Stage)	3rd of 5 (Group Stage)	—		DNP	
2023–24	1st	22	15	3	4	47	26	48	Runners-up	2nd of 4 (Group Stage)	Winners	AFC Cup	3rd of 4 (Group Stage)	5th of 6 (Super Six)	
2024–25	1st	24	17	5	2	47	16	56	Winners	Semi Finalists	Runners-up	AFC Champions League Two	Withdrawn (Group Stage)	7th of 13 (Group Stage)	
