= List of Salgaocar FC seasons =

Salgaocar Sports Club is an Indian professional association football club based in Goa. The club was formed in Goa in 1956.

Salgaocar have won the League championship 2 times, and the Federation Cup 4 times.

== Key ==
- P = Played
- W = Games won
- D = Games drawn
- L = Games lost
- F = Goals for
- A = Goals against
- Pts = Points
- Pos = Final position
- Div 1 = National Football League
- Div 2 = National Football League Second Division
- IL = I-League
- F = Final
- Group = Group stage
- R16 = Round of 16
- QF = Quarter-finals
- R1 = Round 1
- R2 = Round 2
- R3 = Round 3
- R4 = Round 4
- R5 = Round 5
- R6 = Round 6
- SF = Semi-finals

1st or W	Winners
2nd or RU	Runners-up
↑	Promoted
↓	Relegated
♦	Top scorer in division

== Seasons ==
Results of league and cup competitions by season
Season	Division	P	W	D	L	F	A	Pts	Pos	Federation Cup	Super Cup	Asia	Round reached	Name	Goals
Season	League									Federation Cup	Super Cup	Asia	Round reached	Top goalscorer	
1996–97	Div 1	19	5	7	7	10	13	22	7th	—	—	—	—	—	—
1997–98	Div 1	18	8	6	4	19	13	30	3rd	—	—	—	—	—	—
1998–99	Div 1	20	11	6	3	6	34	14	1st	—	—	—	—	—	—
1999–2000	Div 1	22	11	6	5	26	15	39	3rd	—	—	—	—	—	—
2000–01	Div 1	22	8	2	12	23	26	26	6th	—	—	—	—	—	—
2001–02	Div 1	22	10	9	3	32	17	39	4th	—	—	—	—	—	—
2002–03	Div 1	22	13	5	4	43	17	44	2nd	—	—	—	—	—	—
2003–04	Div 1	22	7	6	9	24	23	27	7th	—	—	—	—	—	—
2004–05	Div 1	22	7	7	8	26	24	28	6th	—	—	—	—	—	—
2005–06	Div 1	17	2	6	9	15	29	12	9th	—	—	—	—	—	—
2006–07	Div 2	10	7	3	0	16	6	24	1st	—	—	—	—	—	—
2007–08	IL	18	1	8	9	20	37	11	10th	R1	—	—	—	Felix Chimaokwu	7
2009	IL2	9	6	2	1	12	5	20	1st	R1	—	—	—	—	—
2009–10	IL	26	8	9	9	34	38	33	6th	R1	—	—	—	Ekene Ikenwa	11
2010–11	IL	26	18	2	6	58	27	56	1st	QF	—	—	—	Ryuji Sueoka	18
