= List of Dempo SC seasons =

Dempo Sports Club is an Indian professional association football club based in Goa. The club was formed in Goa in 1968.

Dempo have won the League championship 5 times, and the Federation Cup once. They were though the winners of the 2006 National Football League Second Division.

== Key ==
- P = Played
- W = Games won
- D = Games drawn
- L = Games lost
- F = Goals for
- A = Goals against
- Pts = Points
- Pos = Final position
- Div 1 = National Football League
- Div 2 = National Football League Second Division
- IL = I-League
- F = Final
- Group = Group stage
- R16 = Round of 16
- QF = Quarter-finals
- R1 = Round 1
- R2 = Round 2
- R3 = Round 3
- R4 = Round 4
- R5 = Round 5
- R6 = Round 6
- SF = Semi-finals

1st or W	Winners
2nd or RU	Runners-up
↑	Promoted
↓	Relegated
♦	Top scorer in division

== Seasons ==
Results of league and cup competitions by season
Season	Division	P	W	D	L	F	A	Pts	Pos	Federation Cup	Super Cup	Asia	Round reached	Name	Goals
Season	League									Federation Cup	Super Cup	Asia	Round reached	Top goalscorer	
1996–97	Div 1	19	8	6	5	26	18	30	4th	F	—	—	—	—	—
1997–98	Div 1	18	5	7	6	20	22	22	6th	SF	—	—	—	—	—
1998–99	Div 1	10	2	3	5	6	11	9	10th	R16	—	—	—	—	—
1999–2000	Div 1	22	1	8	13	9	34	11	12th ▼	Not held	—	—	—	—	—
2000–01	Div 2	12	10	1	1	29	7	31	3rd	Not held	—	—	—	—	—
2001–02	Div 2	7	7	0	0	14	0	21	1st ▲	F	—	—	—	—	—
2002–03	Div 1	22	10	5	7	34	29	35	6th	R16	—	—	—	—	—
2003–04	Div 1	22	12	9	1	28	12	45	2nd	W	—	—	—	(Liberia) Sunday Seah	9
2004–05	Div 1	22	14	5	3	28	17	47	1st	—	—	—	—	—	—
2005–06	Div 1	17	6	7	4	29	22	25	5th	—	F	AFC Cup	GS	(Nigeria) Ranti Martins	13
2006–07	Div 1	18	11	3	4	37	21	36	1st	—	—	—	—	(Nigeria) Ranti Martins	16
2007–08	IL	18	10	6	2	35	13	36	1st	SF	F	AFC Cup	SF	(Nigeria) Ranti Martins	17
2008–09	IL	22	8	7	7	35	26	31	4th	F	W	AFC Cup	R16	(Nigeria) Ranti Martins	9
2009–10	IL	26	16	6	4	54	31	54	1st	GS	F	—	—	(Nigeria) Ranti Martins	13
2010–11	IL	26	15	5	6	63	34	50	3rd	SF	W	AFC Cup	R16	(Nigeria) Ranti Martins	30
2011–12	IL	26	18	3	5	59	21	57	1st	GS	—	—	—	(Nigeria) Ranti Martins	32
2012–13	IL	26	11	7	8	45	33	40	5th	F	–	–	–	(Japan) Ryuji Sueoka	11
2013–14	IL	24	9	8	7	31	25	35	4th	SF	–	–	–		
2014–15	IL	20	3	10	7	15	26	19	10th ▼	F	–	–	–		
2015–16	IL2	18	12	2	4	32	10	38	1st ▲	–	–	–	–	(Nigeria) Felix Chidi Odili	7
2016–17	Withdrew from I-League & I-League 2														
2017–18	Withdrew from I-League & I-League 2														
2018–19	Withdrew from I-League & I-League 2														
2019–20	Withdrew from I-League & I-League 2														
2020–21	Withdrew from I-League & I-League 2														
2021–22	Withdrew from I-League & I-League 2														
2022–23	IL2	8	4	2	2	9	6	14	GS ▼	–	–	–	–		
2023–24	IL3	8	5	2	1	11	2	17	2nd ▲	–	–	–	–		
2023–24	IL2	14	8	3	3	21	13	27	2nd ▲	–	–	–	–		
2024–25	IL	22	8	5	9	35	33	29	6th	–	–	–	–		
2025–26	IFL	14	3	6	5	17	18	15	6th	GS	–	–	–	(Trinidad and Tobago) Marcus Joseph	9
2026–27	IFL														
