= Ranti Martins =

Nigerian footballer (born 1986)

Personal information
- Full name: Ranti Martins Soleye
- Date of birth: 5 September 1986 (age 40)
- Place of birth: Agege, Lagos, Nigeria
- Height: 1.84 m (6 ft 0 in)
- Position: Striker

Youth career
- Asante Kotoko

Senior career*
Years	Team	Apps	(Gls)
2003-2004	King Faisal Babes	28	(16)
2004–2012	Dempo	245	(165)
2012–2014	Prayag United	40	(32)
2013	→ Rangdajied United (loan)	17	(8)
2014–2016	East Bengal FC	36	(20)
2014	→ Goa (loan)	16	(8)
2016	Penang FA	10	(4)
Total		448	(345)
- * Club domestic league appearances and goals as of 13 June 2017

Ranti Martins Soleye(born 5 September 1986) is a Nigerian former professional footballer who played as a striker. Martins regarded as one of the best foreign players to play in India. He is the record goal scorer in the history of Indian top-flight football with 214 goals., and set the record for most goals scored in an Indian top tier season by scoring 32 goals in the 2011–12 I-League season for Dempo. He also finished as the first tier's top scorer in six seasons, more times than any other player. He scored a total 22 goals for Indian clubs at the continental tournament AFC Cup.

== Club career ==
=== Nigeria & Ghana ===
Martins as a teenager went to Anwar-L-Islam College in Agege, Lagos where he played for the football club in the Principal Cup and the Shell Cup. He then moved to Ghana where he joined Asante Kotoko Football Academy. He stayed at the Academy till 2004 before moving to King Faisal Babes in the Ghana Premier League.

=== Dempo ===
In 2004 Martins signed for Dempo S.C. of the National Football League. His first tournament was the 2004 Federation Cup which Dempo won. After playing his first season with Dempo during the 2004–05 Martins finished the season as the 2nd top scorer at 15 goals, behind Dudu Omagbemi who had 21 goals. He did however lead Dempo to the championship that very season as well. Martins made his debut in the AFC Cup during the 2005 version of the cup against Al Ahed of Lebanon on 9 March 2005. Dempo lost the match 0–1.

The next season after the 2005–06 season Dempo finished in 5th place but Martins himself finished as the league top scorer with 13 goals. He also scored 2 goals during the 2006 AFC Cup against Al-Nasr from Oman and FC Merw of Turkmenistan. Both matches ended 1–3 and 2–2 respectively. The next season Ranti Martins finished as joint top scorer with Odafe Onyeka Okolie with 16 goals.

Martins then became one of the top scorers in the first season of the newly started I-League in 2007–08 when he scored 12 goals throughout the whole season, only ten goals behind the top scorer Odafe Onyeka Okolie, and tied with Somalian Mboyo Iyomi. However it was enough to help Dempo win the I-League that season. With the I-League victory Dempo once again played in the AFC Cup in 2008 in which Martins ended up as the third top scorer of the tournament with eight goals as he helped Dempo reach the semi-finals where the club succumbed to Al-Safa of Lebanon by an aggregate score of 5–1. Martins then however regressed during the next season of the I-League in the 2008–09 in which Martins finished with only nine goals as Dempo went on finish fourth in the league that season. He did though lead Dempo to their second I-League title in the very next season, with himself scoring 13 goals during the whole season. Meanwhile, during that season Martins helped Dempo make it to the Round of 16 during the 2009 AFC Cup in which he finished tied for eighth in scoring with five goals during the tournament.

Martins then finally finished as the top scorer in the I-League after scoring 28 goals during the 2010–11 season but he could not help Dempo win the title as Dempo finished in third place. Martins then became the top scorer again in the I-League the next season, the 2011–12 season, with 32 goals and he also helped Dempo win the I-League title.

=== United ===
==== 2012–13 season ====
On 12 May 2012 it was officially confirmed that Martins had signed with big spenders, Prayag United, who also play in the I-League. Martins made his official debut for Prayag United on 20 September 2012 against Salgaocar in the first match of the 2012 Indian Federation Cup in which Prayag United lost 1–0. Martins then made his league debut for Prayag United on 7 October 2012 against Air India in which he also scored a debut hat-trick for his club as Prayag United won the match 5–1. Martins then scored again on 26 October 2012 against ONGC at the Ambedkar Stadium as Prayag United drew the match 1–1.

Martins then scored a double for Prayag United against Shillong Lajong on 4 November 2012 in which Prayag United still lost by a score of 3–2. However Martins helped Prayag United win their next match by a score of 10–1 against newly promoted United Sikkim in which Martins himself scored five goals. He did not find the net again until 2 December 2012 in which he scored the opening goal against Mumbai at the Salt Lake Stadium, however that goal did not help Prayag United as they lost the match in the end by a score of 3–2. Martins then scored in his next match against his former club, Dempo, on 8 December 2012 in which he scored the opening goal in the 21st minute and he did not celebrate the goal out of respect for Dempo. Dempo went on to defeat Prayag United 3–1. Despite the loss though Martins helped Prayag United win their next match against the undefeated East Bengal on 16 December 2012 in which Martins scored the only goal of the game in the 75th minute for as the side went on to win 1–0. Martins then finished off the year 2012 with yet another goal, this time against Sporting Clube de Goa, on 29 December 2012 but again it was in vain as Prayag United lost the match 3–1.

Martins opened up his 2013 account on 9 January 2013 when he scored the second goal for Prayag United against Pune at the Salt Lake Stadium to give Prayag United a 2–0 victory. Martins then scored again in the next match against Sporting Clube de Goa on 12 January 2013 but this time with a better result as Prayag United won the match 2–1. He ended the month of January by scoring the equalising goal in a 1–1 affair with Mohun Bagan on 27 January.

Martins then went on the finish the season in emphatic form by scoring a goal in each of his last seven games of the season. The first goal came against Air India while the second came against Churchill Brothers. The third goal came against United Sikkim while the fourth against East Bengal. His fifth goal on his streak came against Pailan Arrows with the next against Shillong Lajong. Martin's final goal of the season, and seventh on his streak, came on 11 May 2013 against ONGC.

After the season concluded Martins was awarded the "Best Player of the I-League" award by the All India Football Federation as well as the "Best Forward" award.

==== 2013–14 season ====
Following his impressive first season with United, Martins began the new campaign the same way he finished the old one, by scoring the first of two goals for United against newly promoted Rangdajied United at the Salt Lake Stadium on 22 September 2013. He then scored his second goal of the season in the very next match against Sporting Goa on 29 September as United won 3–1.

Martins then went a month before scoring his next two goals, a brace, against Churchill Brothers on 2 November as United won the match 3–2.

==== Rangdajied United (loan) ====
On 14 February 2014 it was confirmed that Martins would sign on loan with fellow I-League side Rangdajied United for the rest of the season after United experienced some financial difficulties. He made his debut for his new side on 1 March 2014 against Bengaluru FC in which he scored the winning goal for his new side as they ran out 3–2 winners against the eventual champions. Martins then scored another goal in his second game for his new club, against his parent club United, on 9 March. His goal allowed Rangdajied United to come out 4–0 winners.

He scored his first brace for the club on 29 March against Salgaocar as Rangdajied United ran out 2–1 winners.

=== East Bengal ===
On 30 April 2014 it was announced that Martins had signed a two-year contract with I-League runners-up East Bengal. On joining the club, he commented "It's a privilege to join East Bengal. It will be something new for me but I don't see it as any pressure and instead look at it as a responsibility."

On 18 January 2015, Martins scored his first goal for the club in his league debut against Sporting Clube de Goa. On 1 March 2015 Martins historically scored all five goals in a 5–1 win over his former club Dempo.

On 12 May 2016 it was announced that Martins was not in the plans of the returning East Bengal head coach, Trevor Morgan, and that he would be leaving the club.

=== Penang FA ===
After playing for twelve years in India, Martins signed for Penang FA of the Malaysian Super League on 12 July 2016. He scored two goals in his debut match.

=== Maryland SGFC Eagles ===
On 2 January 2017 it was announced that Martins has successfully penned a deal with Maryland-based SGFC Eagles which features in the American Soccer League. American Soccer League (ASL) is a developmental league that provides American soccer players with professional playing opportunities as well as a direct pathway into the major soccer leagues around the world. The club is being run by soccer enthusiast Americans. The SGFC has won all the titles in the amateur league in the northeast of America before being drafted by the American Professional Soccer league.

== International career ==
Martins, despite playing in the Indian I-League, believes that he has what it takes to play for his birth country Nigeria. According to Martins he had a chance to play for the Nigerian U20s but AFC Cup commitments and the Dempo president failing to tell Martins on time stopped that from happening. Martins also said that at one point an official from the Nigeria Football Federation arrived in India to watch him play a match and that he would be watching Martins.

Martins also hit back at the question of how he would get a call-up if he was playing in the Indian league, a league considered lower standard for the Nigeria national team, by saying "I know that many people will begin to say that what is in India league, but I want to say here that the league in India is very strong. It is stronger than what we have in Nigeria because it is improving every season. More so, I want the handlers of the national team to look at the quality of the individuals and not where they play. I know my quality as a striker and I want the coaches, particularly Stephen Keshi to give an opportunity to prove myself. I won't disappoint him."

=== Chance to play for Ghana ===
In 2003, Martins was using a Ghanaian passport from which his agent gave him and at one point he was offered the chance to join the Ghana U17s for the 2005 African U-17 Championship qualifiers. However Martins rejected the offer due to his loyalty towards Nigeria. Otherwise he might have been a Ghanaian International footballer.

== Career statistics ==
As of match played 14 March 2016

Appearances and goals by club, season and competition
Club	Season	League			Federation Cup		Durand Cup and CFL		AFC		Total	
Club	Season	Division	Apps	Goals	Apps	Goals	Apps	Goals	Apps	Goals	Apps	Goals
Dempo	2004–05	NFL	49	15	4	5	0	0	4 (Note: Appearance in AFC Cup)	2	66	22
Dempo	2005–06	NFL	49	14	1	1	0	0	—	—	66	15
Dempo	2006–07	NFL	49	16	3	2	5	1	—	—	66	19
Dempo	2007–08	I-League	18	12	3	1	0	0	10	8	31	21
Dempo	2008–09	I-League	22	12	4	3	0	0	7	5	33	20
Dempo	2009–10	I-League	25	15	4	5	0	0	—	—	29	20
Dempo	2010–11	I-League	25	30	3	1	0	0	7	3	35	34
Dempo	2011–12	I-League	25	32	0	0	0	0	—	—	25	32
Dempo	Total		164	146	22	18	5	1	28	18	219	183
Prayag United	2012–13	I-League	25	27	2	0	0	0	—	—	27	26
Prayag United	2013–14	I-League	15	4	2	1	0	0	—	—	17	5
Prayag United	Total		40	31	4	1	0	0	0	0	44	32
Rangdajied United (loan)	2013–14	I-League	8	8	0	0	0	0	—	—	8	8
Goa (loan)	2014	Indian Super League	7	0	—	—	—	—	—	—	7	0
East Bengal	2014–15	I-League	20	17	2	0	10	8	6	4	36	29
East Bengal	2015–16	I-League	16	12	2	1	6	1	0	0	24	14
East Bengal	Total		36	29	4	1	16	9	6	4	60	43
Career total			255	214	30	20	21	10	34	22	338	266

== Honours ==
Dempo

- National Football League: 2004–05, 2006–07; runner-up: 2003–04
- I-League: 2007–08, 2009–10, 2011–12
- Federation Cup: 2004
- Durand Cup: 2006

Prayag United

- IFA Shield: 2013

Individual

- National Football League India Golden Boot: 2005–06
- I-League Golden Boot: 2010–11, 2011–12 2012–13, 2014–15, 2015–16
- I-League Best Player: 2012–13

Records

- Most individual goals in a match of I-League: 7 (Dempo vs Air India in 2010–11)
- Maximum number of goals in one edition of I-League: 32, in 2011–12.
- Most goals in AFC Cup representing Indian clubs: 18

== See also ==
- List of foreign players for SC East Bengal
