= Mboyo Iyomi =

Congolese footballer

Personal information
- Full name: Mboyo Iyomi Tusevo
- Date of birth: 18 April 1984 (age 42)
- Place of birth: Zaire (now DR Congo)
- Position: Forward

Senior career*
Years	Team	Apps	(Gls)
2007–2008	Churchill Brothers S.C.		(12)
2008–2009	Dempo S.C.		(3)
2009–2010	Al-Saqr SC		
2011–2012	C.R. Caála		
- * Club domestic league appearances and goals

Mboyo Iyomi (born 18 April 1984) is a Congolese-Somalian former professional footballer who predominantly played as a forward. He last played for Angolan Girabola outfit C.R. Caála in 2012. Besides Congo, he has played in Angola, Yemen, and India.

== Club career ==
=== Churchill Brothers ===
Iyomi was born. in DR Congo. He began his professional career in India at I-League side Churchill Brothers SC in 2007. Describing his situation at Churchill Brothers for 2007–08 season, Iyomi stated that "With Felix and Odafa at Churchill, I am an extra which I don’t want to be," implying that he was a used as a third-string striker.

In the 2007–08 I-League, he debuted for Churchill against Sporting Clube de Goa on 25 November 2007, where he scored a goal. He showed his talent and skills, scoring all total 12 goals for the Red Machine.

With Churchill Brothers, he also appeared in the 2008 IFA Shield and made the Semi-finals. He scored 4 goals including a goal against Mahindra United FC in the semis.

=== Dempo SC ===
Ahead of the 2008–09 I-League, Iyomi secured a contract with Dempo SC. He bagged a hat-trick in a 3–3 stalemate with Churchill Brothers, his previous club.

He has appeared with Dempo in the 2008 AFC Cup, where he scored 2 goals against Al-Safa of Lebanon and Home United FC of Singapore. However, the Congolese-born forward got hold of an injury to the groin in 2009, causing him to part ways with Dempo and not participate in the prilimenary rounds of the AFC Champions League.

=== Al Saqr ===
Suffered a ligament injury with Al-Saqr in 2010 which required a recovery program lasting one week which exacerbated the situation.

=== Recreativo da Caála ===
In 2011, he signed with Angolan Girabola outfit Recreativo da Caála. He spent half a season with the club and was in the 2012 Angola Cup winning squad.

== Personal life ==
Iyomi was born on 18 April 1984 in Kinshasa, largest city of Zaire (now DR Congo). He later moved to Somalia and started playing football.

During his days in India he quoted; "We feel it is easier to play in Europe if we play in India." He also added; "Money is not the parameter. A lot of teams in African countries like Algeria and Egypt pay more than the Indian clubs. But we are thinking two-three years down the line -- if we play in India, we might get noticed more and it could be easier to go to Europe."

== Honours ==
Churchill Brothers

- I-League: 2007–08
- Goa Professional League: 2009

Recreativo da Caála

- Angola Cup: runner-up 2012
