= Salgaocar FC =

Indian association football club based in Goa

Salgaocar
- Full name: Salgaocar Football Club
- Nickname: The Greens
- Short name: SFC
- Founded: 1956; 70 years ago (as Vimson Club / Clube Desportivo Salgaocar)
- Ground: Monte de Guirim Football Ground; Duler Stadium (selected matches)
- Capacity: 1,000; 10,000
- Owner: Shivanand Salgaocar (V. M. Salgaocar Group of Companies)
- Website: salgaocarfc.in
Home colours	Away colours

Salgaocar Football Club, formerly known as Salgaocar Sporting Club, is an Indian professional football club based in Vasco, Goa. Being one of the country's most successful clubs, it is currently operating youth teams only. Until the dissolution of its senior team in June 2023, Salgaocar competed in the Goa Professional League.

Salgaocar previously competed in the I-League, then top-flight of the Indian football league system. Founded in 1956, and nicknamed "The Greens", the club is owned by V. M. Salgaocar Group of Companies. Salgaocar has won 21 Goa championships, 4 Federation Cups, 3 Durand Cups, 3 Rovers Cups, 2 Indian Super Cups and the National Football League in 1999, and the I-League in 2011. They became the first Goan side to win the National Football League, under the guidance of coach Shabbir Ali. It is also the first Goan club to win the following: Goa Super Division, Federation Cup, Goa Professional League, Durand Cup and the former Indian Super Cup. Salgaocar pulled out of the I-League in 2017, citing the All India Football Federation (AIFF) bias.

== History ==
=== 1956–2009 ===
Salgaocar Sports Club was established in 1956 as the Vimson Club and also participated as Clube Desportivo Salgaocar until the liberation of Goa in 1961. It was founded by VM Salgaocar, founder President of the VM Salgaocar Group of Companies, to give a platform to the Goan youth to showcase their talent to the country, and to the world. In 1962, Salgaocar Sports Club became the first Goan team to be extended an invitation to play in the prestigious Durand Cup in New Delhi, and such was the joy of a Goan team's participation in the Durand Cup, that the late Prime Minister Jawaharlal Nehru felicitated the team at his residence. In 1988, they clinched the Sait Nagjee Cup in Kerala. In 1989, they reached the final again, but ended-up as runners-up after their defeat to Bangladeshi club Dhaka Abahani.

In 1990, Salgaocar participated at the Jawaharlal Nehru Centenary Club Cup in Kolkata, which is the only international club tournament held in India. They were knocked out of the tournament after finishing on the bottom of Group-A, where they faced clubs like Paraguayan side Club Olimpia and Danish side Lyngby Boldklub. The club was briefly managed by noted Indian coach T. K. Chathunni in the late 1990s.

Salgaocar participated in the National Football League (India) since the tournament began in 1996, and successfully conquered all possible trophies on the Indian circuit, thereby etching their name amongst the top teams in the country. A National League triumph in 1999, 3 Federation Cups in 1988, 1989 and 1997, Super Cup in 1997 and 1999, prestigious Rovers Cup, in 1989, 1996 and 1999, Durand Cup, twice in 1999 and 2003, Sait Nagjee Trophy in Calicut, in 1987 and TFA shield at Madurai, in 1979. Salgaocar Sports Club have also been crowned Goa State Champions for a record 19 times including winners for 3 consecutive years of the Goa Professional League in 2002–03, 2003–04 and 2004–05. The club also won the Governor's Cup in the years 1999 and 2001. The late 1980s and the 1990s saw Salgaocar SC consistently win trophies such as the Federation Cup, the National League, the Durand Cup, Rovers Cup and the Super Cup.

In later years, relegation, a successful promotion, and then again relegation left the Salgaocar faithful shattered. Critics were swift in writing the club off, but the team managed to make the first division of the NFL in 2003 and staying there until the beginning of the I-League. In 1996, Salgaocar became one of the original 12 clubs in the National Football League and finished 3rd in Group A but finished 7th in the Final Round. In 1998, at the 9th Asian Cup Winners' Cup, Salgaocar caused an upset victory in its home tie at the Fatorda Stadium against one of the Cup favourites Beijing Guoan from China.

In the 2002–03 National Football League season, Salgaocar achieved success and they finished the season in second place, after ending their journey with 44 points in 22 matches. While representing Salgaocar in that season, Tomba Singh was awarded AIFF Player of the Year. In 2007–08 season, the club was managed by Subhash Bhowmick, who also served as their technical director. Salgaocar, along with Viva Kerala, ended up as one of the first two teams to ever be relegated from the I-League, however, the club clinched I-League 2nd Division title in 2008–09 season, and joined I-League.

=== 2010–2023 ===
In the 2010–11 season, Salgaocar played in the I-League which was India's biggest football competition and they emerged as the champions. After 26 rounds, Salgaocar SC won the title and they qualified for the 2012 Asian Champions League qualifying round.

On 29 September 2011, Salgaocar won their second trophy in four months by winning the 2011 Indian Federation Cup by beating East Bengal in the Final 3–1. This was the first time in Salgaocar history that they had completed a double of league and cup win.

Salgaocar started the 2011–12 I-League as the defending champion, but the club had a rather disappointing season, finishing the campaign in 6th. Salgaocar started the 2012–13 campaign with Karim Bencherifa as their head coach. His one-year contract was terminated before the end of the year, due to poor performances and prolonged national team duties. He was replaced by David Booth, who had previously coached Mahindra United and Mumbai. More disappointments followed in the season as they were close to the drop at one time. They finished the season at 7th position. Salgaocar replaced Booth with Derrick Pereira who had been the coach of Pune FC for the past four seasons and had led them to two consecutive top-5 finishes in the I-League. Salgaocar started the 2013–14 I-League brightly and at one time led the table for six game weeks, but a rough patch of 8 games, which included four straight losses, derailed their campaign and saw them lose the title to Bengaluru FC. Salgaocar finished their campaign at third place, which was a marked improvement over their past two campaign finishes.

In 2014 Durand Cup, held from 20 October to 8 November in Goa, Salgaocar emerged championship defeating Pune FC 1–0 in final. The club was later opted out of the 2016–17 I-League season as two other Goan clubs pulled out. In March 2019, the club clinched CEM Gold Cup title defeating Nepali club Sankata in final. In June 2023, Salgaocar announced that they have discontinued the operations of club's senior team. Later in June 2024, club's owner V.M. Salgaocar Group of Companies founded a club as the successor of Salgaocar, named Clube de Salgaocar.

== Club crest and kits ==
In September 2012, Salgaocar unveiled a new club crest, featuring a symbol of glory, mining tools highlighting the foundation of the V. M. Salgaocar Group, a conch symbolising new hope and an auspicious beginning, and a ribbon with fire indicating pride and passion. The club was re-christened as "Salgaocar Football Club" at that time, with the new motto being More than a game, it's our passion.

The club colours are predominantly green, and white. The home kit has green jerseys and socks, while the shorts are white. The away kit has a set of red jerseys and socks, while also having blue/purple shorts.

=== Kit manufacturers and shirt sponsors ===
Period	Kit manufacturer	Shirt sponsor
1956–2014	none	Salgaocar
2014	Triumph Sports	Salgaocar
2015–	Shiv-Naresh	Salgaocar

== Ownership ==
Salgaocar Sports Club was established in 1956 and is owned by the V. M. Salgaocar Group of Companies. It got Indian recognition only when Goa was liberated from Portuguese rule in 1961.

== Stadium ==
Salgaocar SC played their home games at Fatorda Stadium and Tilak Maidan Stadium.

Goa Football Association owned Duler Stadium became the home ground of Salgaocar during the 2012–13 I-League, alongside Tilak Maidan Stadium. Duler became the second Goa-based stadium to get astroturf, in 2012.

=== Training grounds ===
Salgaocar players also practiced at the BITS Pilani Campus grounds. The team has its in-house gym with modern equipment and professional trainers.

== Rivalries ==
Salgaocar has rivalries with their fellow Goan sides; Dempo, Churchill Brothers, and Sporting Clube de Goa, whom they faced in I-League and face in Goa Professional League. Salgaocar used to have also a rivalry with local side Vasco, with both teams contesting what was known as the "Vasco derby".

== Season statistics ==
1st or W|Winners
2nd or RU|Runners-up
↑ |Promoted
↓ |Relegated
♦ |Top scorer in division

Results of league and cup competitions by season
Season	Division	P	W	D	L	F	A	Pts	Pos	Federation Cup	Super Cup	Asia	Round reached	Name	Goals
Season	League									Federation Cup	Super Cup	Asia	Round reached	Top goalscorer	
1996–97	Div 1	19	5	7	7	10	13	22	7th	—	—	—	—	—	—
1997–98	Div 1	18	8	6	4	19	13	30	3rd	—	—	—	—	—	—
1998–99	Div 1	20	11	6	3	6	34	14	1st	—	—	—	—	—	—
1999–2000	Div 1	22	11	6	5	26	15	39	3rd	—	—	—	—	—	—
2000–01	Div 1	22	8	2	12	23	26	26	6th	—	—	—	—	—	—
2001–02	Div 1	22	10	9	3	32	17	39	4th	—	—	—	—	—	—
2002–03	Div 1	22	13	5	4	43	17	44	2nd	—	—	—	—	—	—
2003–04	Div 1	22	7	6	9	24	23	27	7th	—	—	—	—	—	—
2004–05	Div 1	22	7	7	8	26	24	28	6th	—	—	—	—	—	—
2005–06	Div 1	17	2	6	9	15	29	12	9th	—	—	—	—	—	—
2006–07	Div 2	10	7	3	0	16	6	24	1st	—	—	—	—	—	—
2007–08	IL	18	1	8	9	20	37	11	10th	R1	—	—	—	Felix Chimaokwu	7
2009	IL2	9	6	2	1	12	5	20	1st	R1	—	—	—	—	—
2009–10	IL	26	8	9	9	34	38	33	6th	R1	—	—	—	Ekene Ikenwa	11
2010–11	IL	26	18	2	6	58	27	56	1st	QF	—	—	—	Ryuji Sueoka	18

== Performance in AFC competitions ==
- AFC Cup: 1 appearance

2012: Group stage

- Asian Club Championship: 2 appearances

1989–90: Group stage
1990–91: Group Stage

- Asian Cup Winners' Cup: 1 appearance

1998–99: 1st round

== Honours ==
=== League ===
- National Football League
  - Champions (1): 1998–99
  - Runners-up (1): 2002–03
  - Third place (2): 1997–98, 1999–2000
- I-League
  - Champions (1): 2010–11
- National Football League II
  - Champions (1): 2006–07
- I-League 2nd division
  - Champions (1): 2008–09
- Goa Football League
  - Champions (22): 1960–61, 1962–63, 1963–64, 1965–66, 1974–75, 1977–78, 1981–82, 1982–83, 1984–85, 1985–86, 1988–89, 1990–91, 1992–93, 1994–95, 1998, 2002, 2003, 2004, 2011, 2012–13, 2014–15, 2016–17
  - Runners-up (1): 2007

=== Cup ===
- Federation Cup
  - Champions (4): 1988, 1989, 1997, 2011
  - Runners-up (3): 1987, 1990, 1993
- Indian Super Cup
  - Champions (2): 1998, 1999
  - Runners-up (1): 2011
- Durand Cup
  - Champions (3): 1999, 2003, 2014
- Rovers Cup
  - Champions (3): 1989–90, 1996, 1999
  - Runners-up (1): 1985
- Bordoloi Trophy
  - Runners-up (1): 1985
- Sait Nagjee Football Tournament
  - Champions (1): 1988
  - Runners-up (2): 1985, 1989
- Goa Governor's Cup
  - Champions (2): 1999, 2001
- Bandodkar Gold Trophy
  - Champions (3): 1981, 1988, 1992
  - Runners-up (5): 1970, 1979, 1982, 1984, 1990
- Puttiah Memorial Trophy
  - Champions (1): 1978
  - Runners-up (1): 1977
- Goa Police Cup
  - Champions (1): 1978
  - Runners-up (2): 1970, 2015
- Nehru Club Cup
  - Champions (1): 1985
- Stafford Challenge Cup
  - Runners-up (1): 1984
- AWES Cup
  - Runners-up (1): 2018
- GFA Charity Cup
  - Champions (1): 2017
- CEM Gold Cup
  - Champions (1): 2019

== Team records ==
=== Notable wins against foreign teams ===
As of matches played 16 March 2019

Competition	Round	Date	Opposition	Score	Venue	City	Ref
International club friendly	—	17 November 1988	(South Korea) POSCO Steel	1–0	Dayanand Bandodkar Stadium	Panaji	
Asian Club Championship	Preliminary Round	23 July 1989	(Nepal) Kathmandu Sporting Club	3–0	Fatorda Stadium	Margao	
Asian Club Championship	Group stage	17 July 1990	(Maldives) Club Lagoons	3–1	Bangabandhu National Stadium	Dhaka	
Asian Cup Winner's Cup	First Round	18 September 1998	(China) Beijing Guoan	1–0	Fatorda Stadium	Margao	
AFC Cup	Group stage	24 April 2012	(Oman) Al-Orouba	3–1	Fatorda Stadium	Margao	
CEM Gold Cup	Final	16 March 2019	(Nepal) Sankata B.S.C.	4–2	KASA Stadium	Diphu	

== Notable players ==
For all current and former notable players of Salgaocar FC with a Wikipedia article, see: Salgaocar FC players.

=== World Cup player ===
- (Tunisia) Hamdi Marzouki (2011–2012)

=== Past internationals ===
The following foreign players of Salgaocar, have been capped at full international level. Years in brackets indicate their spells at the club.

- (Nepal) Upendra Man Singh (1998–1999)
- (Uzbekistan) Azamat Abduraimov (1999–2000)
- (Liberia) Eugene Gray (2001–2002)
- (Liberia) Sunday Seah (2001–2003)
- (Nigeria) Julius Akpele (2007–2008)
- (Liberia) Frank Seator (2009)
- (Guinea) Mandjou Keita (2009–2010)
- (Philippines) Ángel Guirado (2012)
- (Namibia) Quinton Jacobs (2012–2013)
- (Singapore) John Wilkinson (2013)
- (Tibet) Karma Tsewang (2013–2015)
- (Scotland) Darryl Duffy (2013–2016)
- (Yemen) Khaled Baleid (2014–2015)
- (Zambia) Francis Kasonde (2014–2015)

== Affiliated clubs ==
The following clubs were affiliated with Salgaocar SC:

- (Scotland) Celtic (2015–2017)
- (India) FC Goa (2014–2016)

== Youth teams and grassroot programs ==
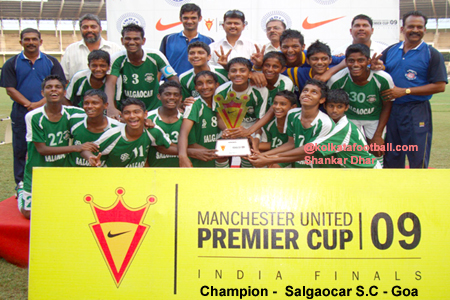
Salgaocar U-15 team with the 2008–09 Manchester United Premier Cup 'India Finals' title

Salgaocar FC's U-19 team has previously participated in various editions of Elite League India/I-League U-19, since its inauguration in 2008. In 2014, the U19 team won Nagaradakshya United Cup in Kolhapur, defeating Dempo in final. In December 2008, Salgaocar U-15 side defeated Raghav Football Club of Gurgaon 2–0 to win the India leg of the fourth (Under-15) Manchester United Premier Cup and earned the right to represent the country in the world finals in Manchester, England.

Salgaocar FC organised three Grassroots Festival through the course of the year to commemorate "AFC Grassroots Day". Children from the club's community outreach program, budding footballers from the club's U-10 and U-12 teams and kids from the club's three partner schools, participated in those festivals. Youth team of Salgaocar reached semi-finals of U-18 I-League in 2017. They launched their grassroots football programme for the youth league of Goa ahead of the 2018–19 season.

== Gallery ==
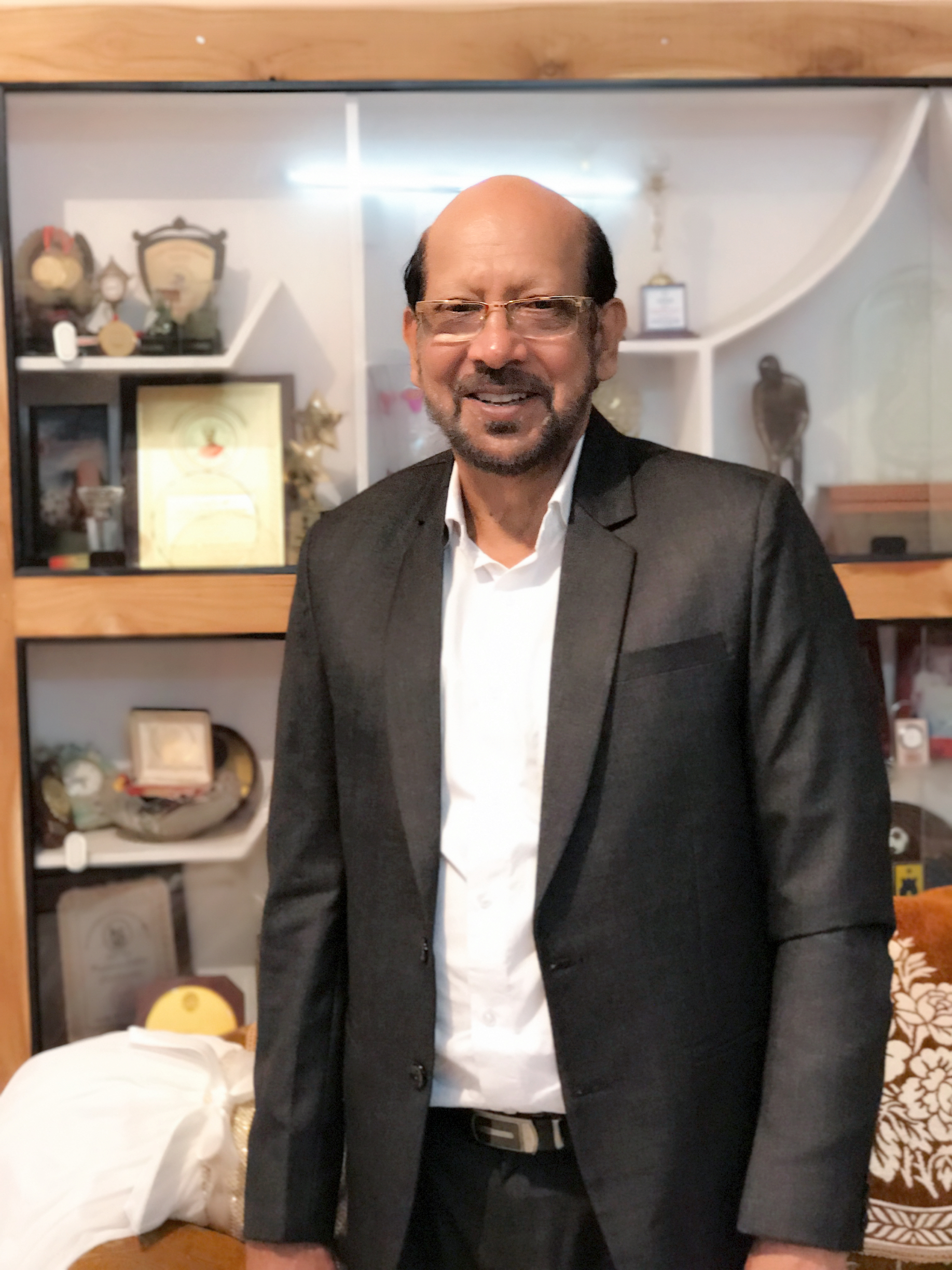
Shabbir Ali guided Salgaocar (the first Goan club) to win their first NFL title in 1999.

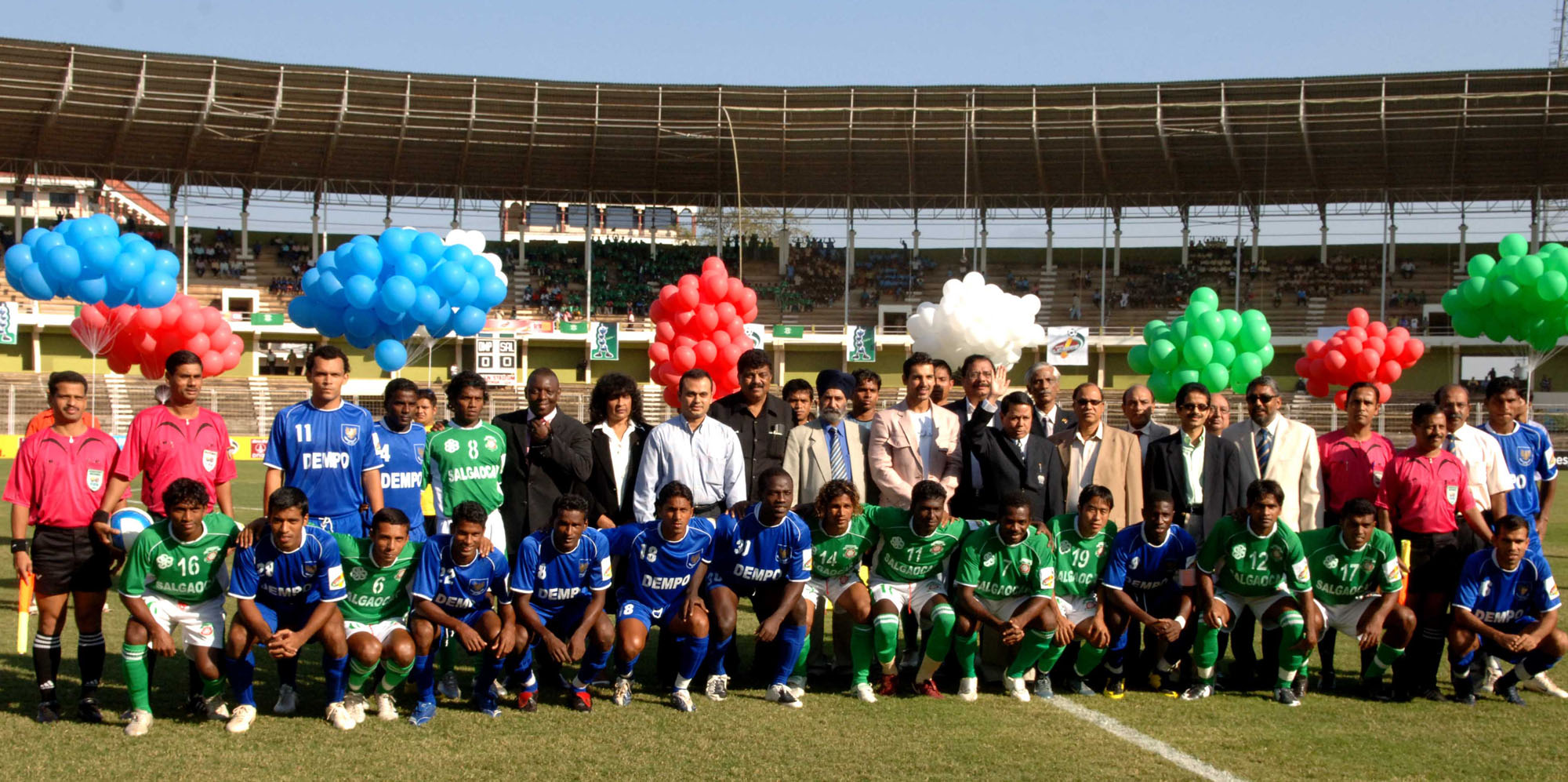
Salgaocar SC players (in green) during their debut match at the 2007–08 I-League, against Dempo SC.

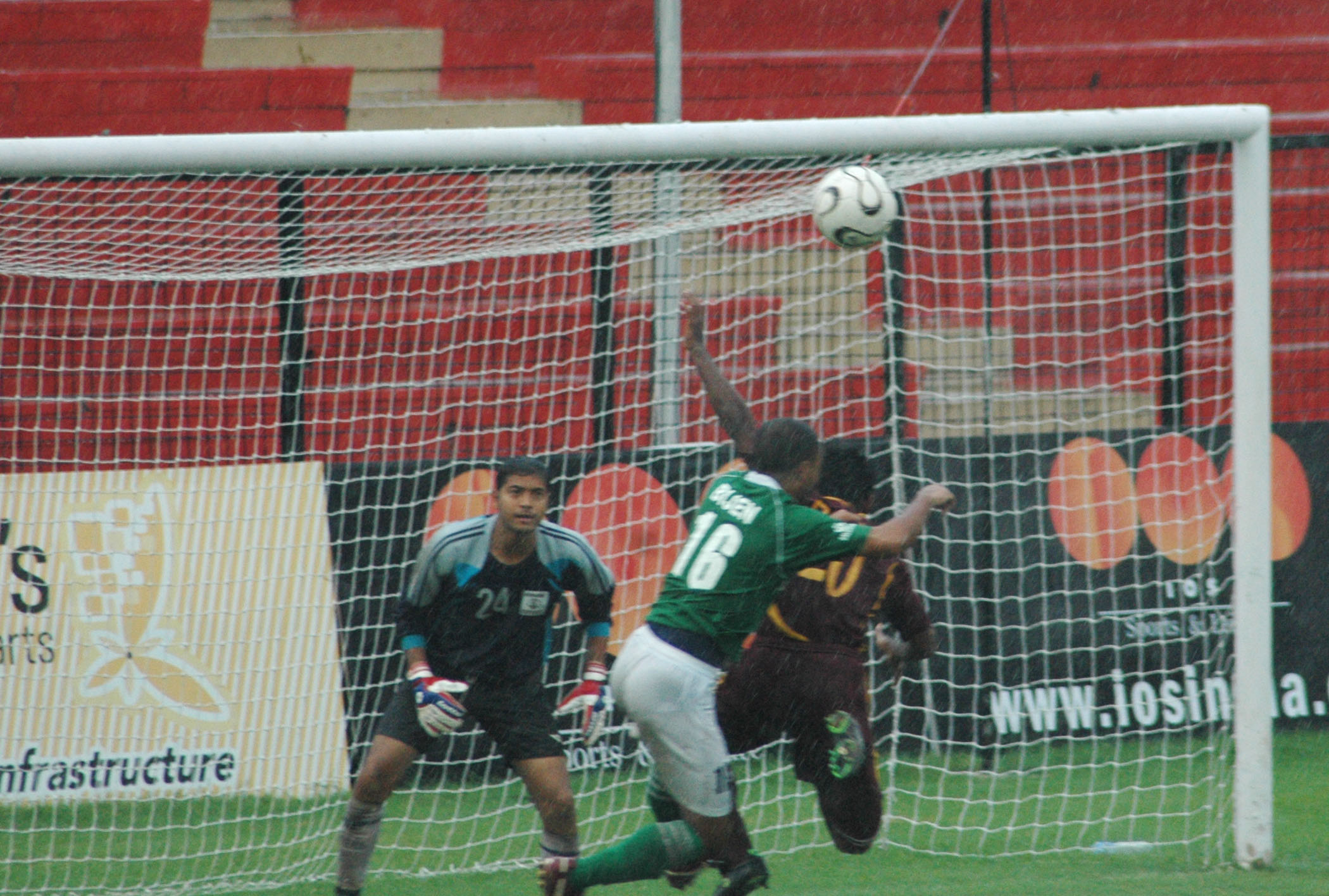
Salgaocar player (green) in action against ONGC during the 121st Osian's Durand Cup in New Delhi, 2008.

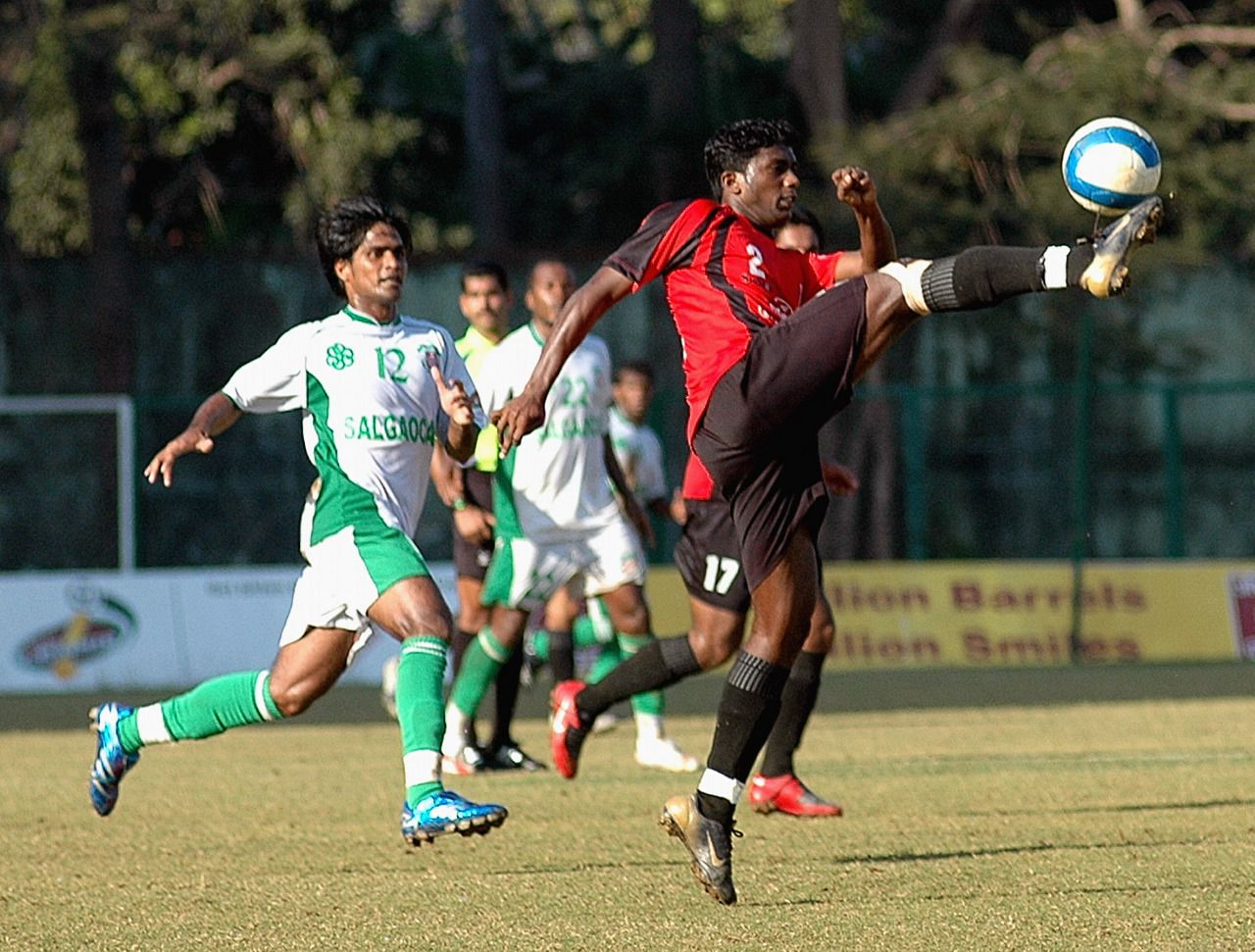
Salgaocar players (in green and white) in action during an I-League match against Mahindra United in 2008

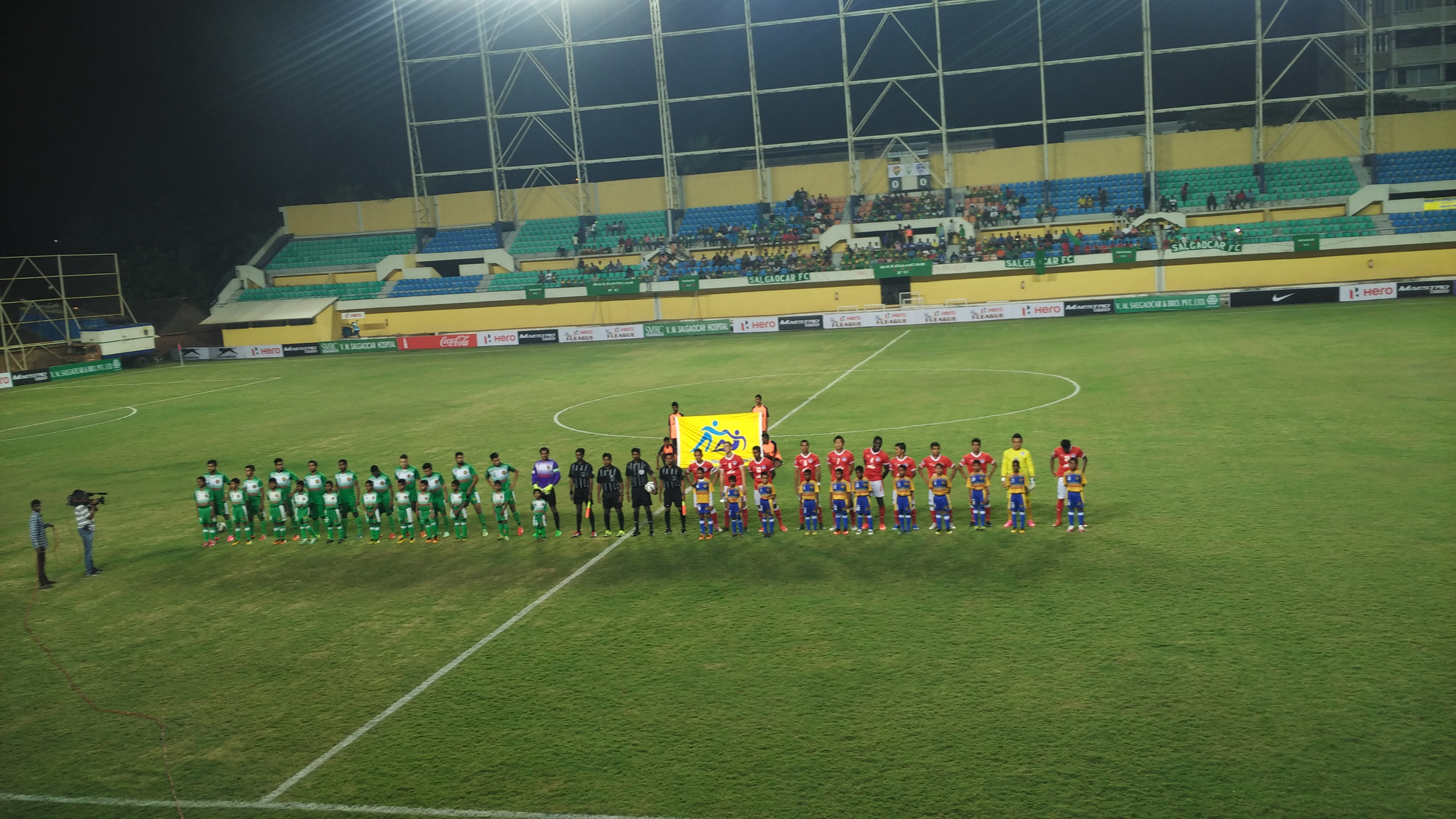
Starting line-up during Salgaocar FC vs Bengaluru FC match for 2015–16 I-League on 9 January 2016

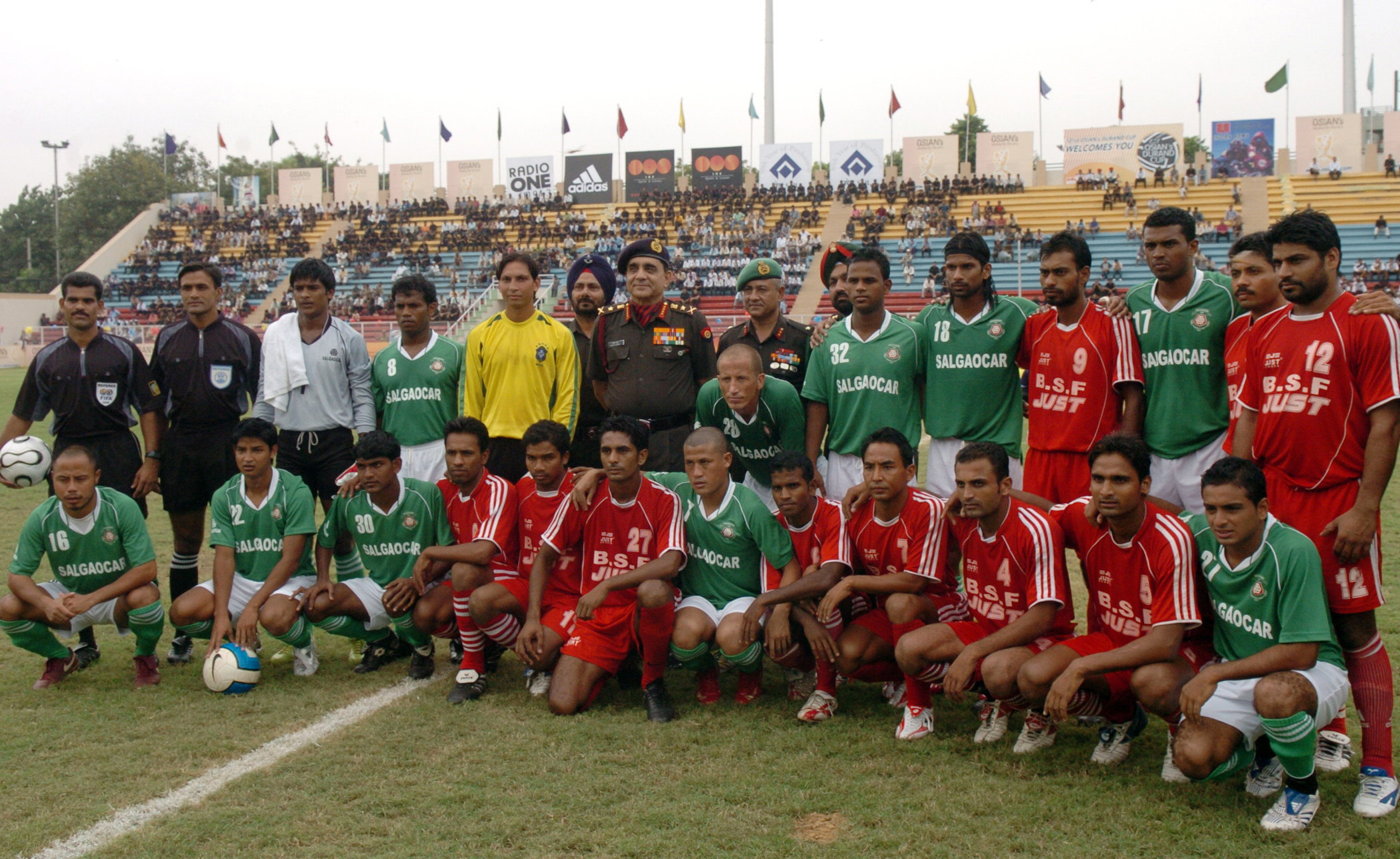
Salgaocar players (in green) during the Durand Cup at the Ambedkar Stadium in 2008

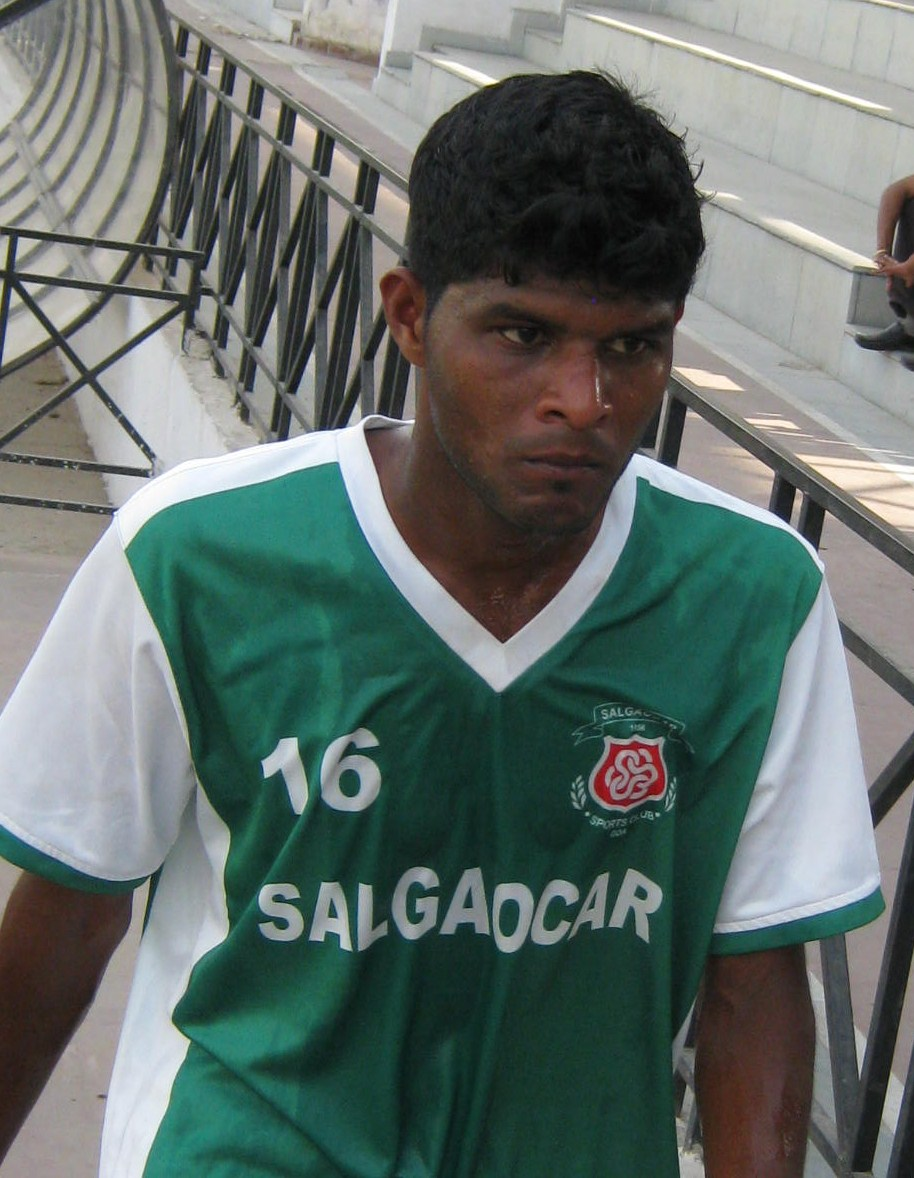
Anthony Barbosa in Salgaocar's home kit in 2011

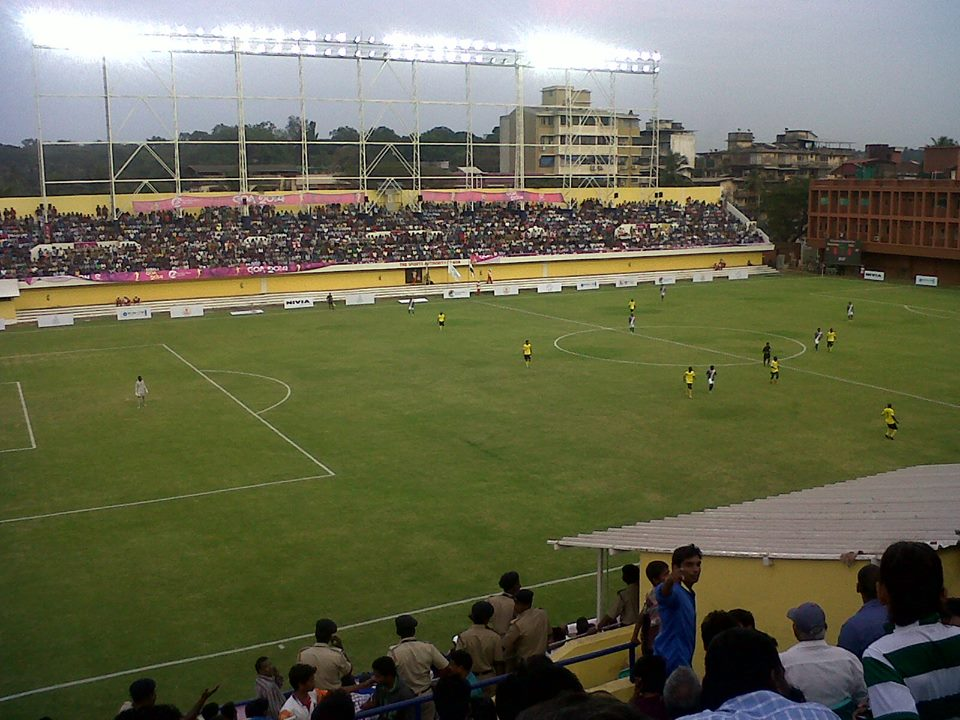
Tilak Maidan Stadium on a matchday

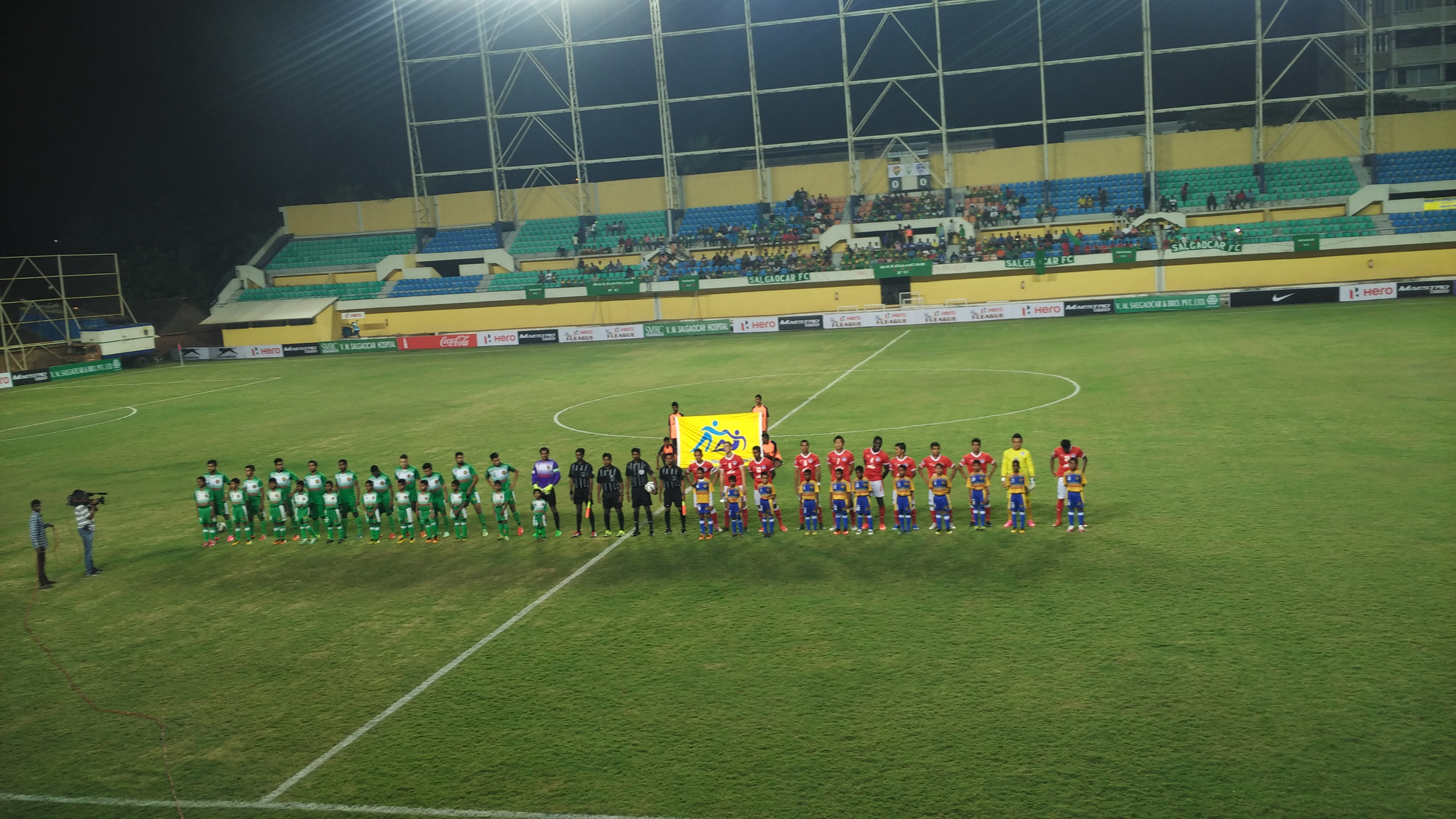
Starting line-up during Salgaocar FC vs Bengaluru FC on 9 January 2016 at the Tilak Maidan Stadium

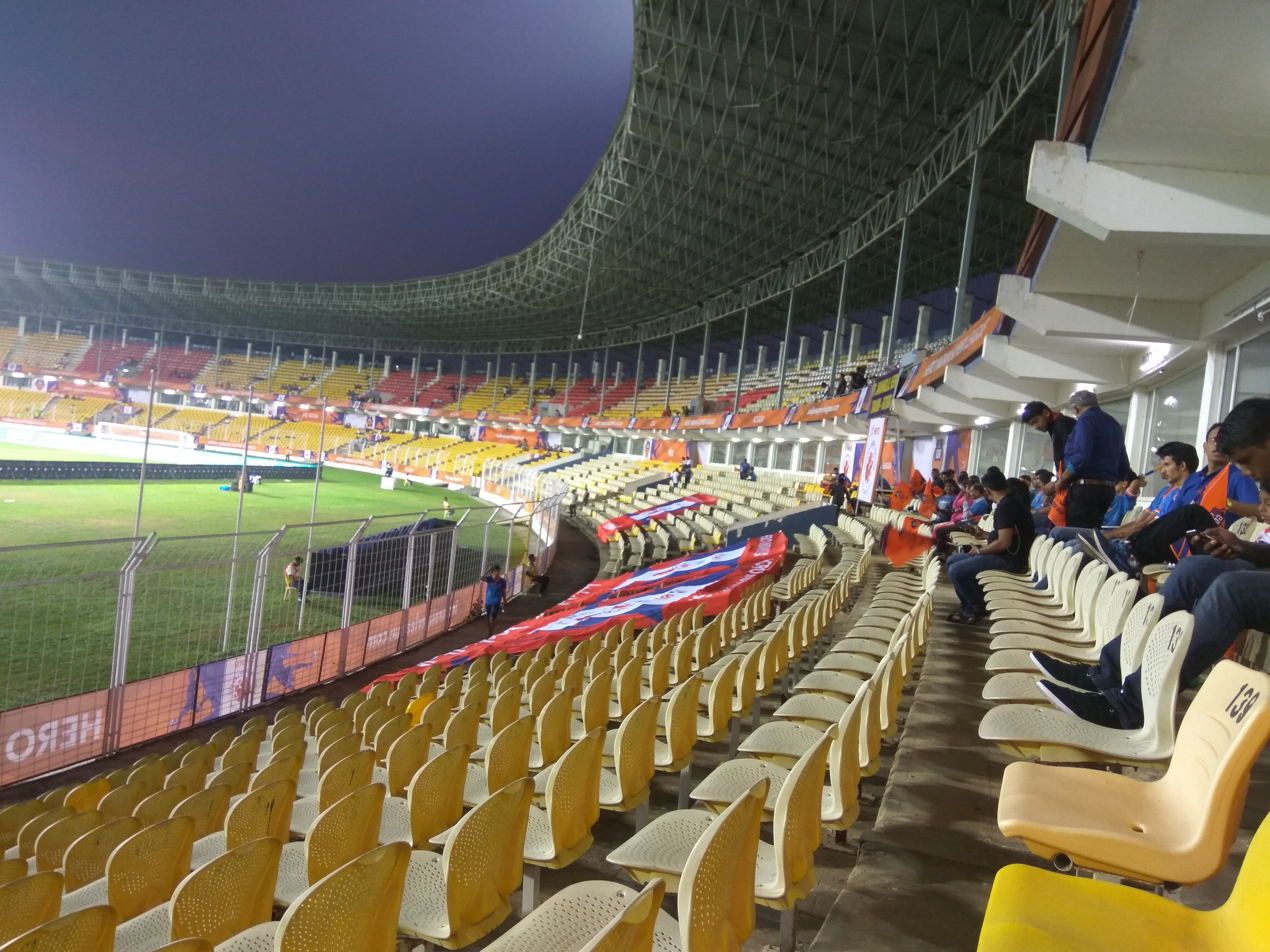
Fatorda Stadium

== See also ==
- List of Salgaocar FC seasons
- Football clubs in Goa
- List of Goan State Football Champions
- Indian football clubs in Asian competitions
