= National Football League (India) =

Former nationwide league competition featuring association football clubs from India

- Founded: 1996; 30 years ago
- Folded: 2007; 19 years ago (reformed as the I-League)
- Country: India
- Confederation: AFC
- Number of clubs: 12 (from 1996–97 to 2003–04); 10 (from 2004–05 to 2006–07)
- Level on pyramid: 1
- Relegation to: National Football League Second Division
- Domestic cup(s): Federation Cup; Indian Super Cup
- International cup(s): AFC Champions League; AFC Cup
- Last champions: Dempo (2nd title) (2006–07)
- Most championships: Mohun Bagan; East Bengal (3 titles each)

The National Football League (NFL) was the men's highest level of the Indian football league system from 1996 to 2007. Founded by the All India Football Federation (AIFF) in 1996, the NFL was the first football league in India to be organized on a national scale. The AIFF then added a second division in 1997 and a third division was soon added by the governing body in 2006. The NFL was eventually replaced by the I-League for the 2007–08 season in order to professionalize the sport in India.

As well as league competition, clubs in the NFL would also participate in the main domestic cup competition, the Federation Cup. The NFL champions would also participate in the Indian Super Cup against the Federation Cup champion. NFL players could also participate in the state-based Santosh Trophy competition.

== History ==
The National Football League was founded by the All India Football Federation, the governing body for football in India, in 1996. The aim of the league was to promote the development of the sport in the country. JCT Mills of Punjab won the inaugural season of the league. Then Indian international Bhaichung Bhutia was the league's top goalscorer with 14 goals. To supplement the Premier Division, the AIFF began the second division of the NFL in 1997. Tollygunge Agragami of Kolkata were the inaugural second division champions.

In 2001, in order to help promote the development of young Indian players, the AIFF launched the under-19 league. The inaugural season of the under-19 league would see East Bengal crowned champions. Only three seasons of the under-19 league were held in 2001, 2002–03, and 2004–05. The AIFF also fielded the India under-16 side in the league when held.

Prior to the 2006–07 season, the AIFF launched a third division, which was essentially just the qualifiers for the second division. After the season concluded, the AIFF announced that the NFL would be disbanded and replaced with a new fully-professional league, the I-League for the 2007–08 season. Dempo finished as the final NFL champions.

== Sponsorship ==
Period	Sponsor	Industry	Tournament
1996–1998	(Netherlands) Philips	Conglomerate	Philips National Football League
1998–2001	(United States) The Coca-Cola Company	Beverage	Coca-Cola National Football League
2001–2002	(India) Tata Group	Conglomerate	Tata National Football League
2002–2003	(India) ONGC, BPCL, HPCL, IOC, GAIL, IBP, Cochin Refineries Ltd. and Chennai Refineries Ltd.	Public sector enterprises	Oil PSU National Football League
2003–2004	(United States) The Coca-Cola Company	Beverage	Coca-Cola National Football League
2004–2007	(India) ONGC	Petroleum	ONGC National Football League (2004–2005) ONGC Cup (2005–2007)

== Clubs ==
Played in NFL Premier Division

- Air India
- Border Security Force
- Churchill Brothers
- Dempo
- East Bengal
- Fransa-Pax
- Hindustan Aeronautics Limited
- Indian Bank
- Indian Telephone Industries
- JCT Mills
- Kerala Police
- Kochin
- Mahindra United
- Mohammedan
- Mohun Bagan
- Punjab Police
- Salgaocar
- Sporting Goa
- State Bank of Travancore
- Tollygunge Agragami
- Vasco

== Champions ==
=== Premier Division ===
Season	Champions (number of titles)	Runners-up	Third place	Leading goalscorer(s)	Goals
1996–97	JCT Mills	Churchill Brothers	East Bengal	(India) Bhaichung Bhutia (JCT Mills)	14
1997–98	Mohun Bagan	East Bengal	Salgaocar	(India) Raman Vijayan (Kochin)	10
1998–99	Salgaocar	East Bengal	Churchill Brothers	(Ghana) Philip Mensah (Churchill Brothers)	11
1999–00	Mohun Bagan	Churchill Brothers	Salgaocar	(Uzbekistan) Igor Shkvyrin (Mohun Bagan)	11
2000–01	East Bengal	Mohun Bagan	Churchill Brothers	(Brazil) José Ramirez Barreto (Mohun Bagan)	14
2001–02	Mohun Bagan	Churchill Brothers	Vasco	(Ghana) Yusif Yakubu (Churchill Brothers)	18
2002–03	East Bengal	Salgaocar	Vasco	(Ghana) Yusif Yakubu (Churchill Brothers)	21
2003–04	East Bengal	Dempo	Mahindra United	(Brazil) Cristiano Júnior (East Bengal)	15
2004–05	Dempo	Sporting Goa	East Bengal	(Nigeria) Dudu Omagbemi (Sporting Goa)	21
2005–06	Mahindra United	East Bengal	Mohun Bagan	(Nigeria) Ranti Martins (Dempo)	13
2006–07	Dempo	JCT Mills	Mahindra United	(Nigeria) Odafa Onyeka Okolie (Churchill Brothers)	18

== See also ==
- List of Indian football champions
- Indian football league system
- Indian Super League
