= 2001–02 National Football League (India) =

6th season of National Football League

National Football League
- Season: 2001–02
- Dates: 12 December 2001 – 15 April 2002
- Champions: Mohun Bagan; 3rd NFL title 3rd Indian title
- Runner up: Churchill Brothers
- Relegated: Punjab Police; Kochin
- AFC Champions League: Mohun Bagan; Churchill Brothers
- Top goalscorer: Yusif Yakubu (18 goals)

The 2001–02 Indian National Football League, also known as Tata National Football League for sponsorship reasons, was the sixth season of National Football League, the top Indian league for association football clubs, since its inception in 1996.

== Overview ==
It was contested by 12 teams, Hindustan Aeronautics Limited (HAL) and Punjab Police were promoted from NFL2. Mohun Bagan won the championship under the coach Subrata Bhattacharya and it was their third title after missing the last title by only a point. Churchill Brothers came second and Vasco came third. Punjab Police and FC Kochin were relegated from the National Football League next season.

== League standings ==
Locations of teams in the 2001–02 National Football League

| Pos | Team | Pld | W | D | L | GF | GA | GD | Pts |
|---|---|---|---|---|---|---|---|---|---|
| 1 | Mohun Bagan | 22 | 13 | 5 | 4 | 31 | 19 | +12 | 44 |
| 2 | Churchill Brothers | 22 | 12 | 6 | 4 | 44 | 19 | +25 | 42 |
| 3 | Vasco | 22 | 12 | 4 | 6 | 28 | 20 | +8 | 40 |
| 4 | Salgaocar | 22 | 10 | 9 | 3 | 32 | 17 | +15 | 39 |
| 5 | East Bengal | 22 | 11 | 3 | 8 | 31 | 23 | +8 | 36 |
| 6 | Mahindra United | 22 | 9 | 6 | 7 | 25 | 19 | +6 | 33 |
| 7 | Indian Telephone Industries | 22 | 8 | 6 | 8 | 26 | 26 | 0 | 30 |
| 8 | Hindustan Aeronautics Limited | 22 | 8 | 4 | 10 | 18 | 26 | −8 | 28 |
| 9 | Tollygunge Agragami | 22 | 6 | 5 | 11 | 26 | 37 | −11 | 23 |
| 10 | JCT Mills | 22 | 5 | 6 | 11 | 18 | 26 | −8 | 21 |
| 11 | Kochin | 22 | 4 | 5 | 13 | 12 | 32 | −20 | 17 |
| 12 | Punjab Police | 22 | 3 | 3 | 16 | 11 | 38 | −27 | 12 |

Source: rsssf.com
