= 2000–01 National Football League (India) =

5th season of National Football League

National Football League
- Season: 2000–01
- Dates: 14 December 2000 – 30 April 2001
- Champions: East Bengal; 1st NFL title 1st Indian title
- Runner up: Mohun Bagan
- Relegated: Air India; State Bank of Travancore
- Asian Club Championship: none
- Top goalscorer: José Ramirez Barreto (14 goals)
- Biggest home win: Mohun Bagan 6–0 Mahindra United (18 March 2001)
- Biggest away win: Kochin 0–4 Mahindra United (28 March 2001)

The 2000–01 National Football League, also known as the Coca-Cola National Football League for sponsorship reasons, was the fifth season of National Football League, the top Indian league for association football clubs, since its inception in 1996.

== Overview ==
It was contested by 12 teams, Vasco and Air India were promoted from NFL-2. East Bengal won the championship. This was East Bengal's first title and the championship was decided on the last day. Mohan Bagan came second only by a point and Churchill Brothers came third. Air India and SBT (State Bank Of Travancore) were relegated from the National Football League.

== League standings ==
Locations of teams in the 2000–01 National Football League

Pos	Team	Pld	W	D	L	GF	GA	GD	Pts
1	East Bengal	22	13	7	2	30	9	+21	46
2	Mohun Bagan	22	13	6	3	40	19	+21	45
3	Churchill Brothers	22	10	6	6	32	25	+7	36
4	Kochin	22	9	7	6	28	31	−3	34
5	Vasco	22	5	12	5	13	17	−4	27
6	Salgaocar	22	8	2	12	23	26	−3	26
7	Mahindra United	22	6	7	9	21	25	−4	25
8	Tollygunge Agragami	22	4	12	6	14	18	−4	24
9	JCT Mills	22	4	11	7	17	22	−5	23
10	Indian Telephone Industries	22	4	10	8	15	19	−4	22
11	Air India	22	5	6	11	25	32	−7	21
12	SBI Kerala	22	4	8	10	24	39	−15	20

Source: rsssf.com
