= 1998–99 National Football League (India) =

3rd season of National Football League

National Football League
- Season: 1998–99
- Dates: 5 January – 22 March 1999
- Champions: Salgaocar; 1st NFL title 1st Indian title
- Runner up: Kingfisher East Bengal
- Relegated: Air India; Indian Bank
- Asian Club Championship: none
- Top goalscorer: Philip Mensah (11 goals)

The 1998–99 National Football League, also known as the Coca-Cola National Football League for sponsorship reasons, was the third season of National Football League, the top Indian league for association football clubs, since its inception in 1996.

== Overview ==
It was contested by 12 teams, and Salgaocar won the championship. East Bengal came second and Churchill Brothers came third.

== First stage ==
Locations of teams in the 1998–99 National Football League
Group A
Group B

=== Group A ===
Pos	Team	Pld	W	D	L	GF	GA	GD	Pts
1	Mohun Bagan (Q)	10	4	5	1	14	7	+7	17
2	JCT (Q)	10	4	5	1	12	8	+4	17
3	Churchill Brothers (Q)	10	3	5	2	15	10	+5	14
4	Tollygunge Agragami	10	3	5	2	9	8	+1	14
5	Dempo	10	2	3	5	6	11	−5	9
6	Air India (R)	10	2	1	7	5	17	−12	7

Source: rsssf.com
(Q) Qualified for the phase indicated; (R) Relegated

=== Group B ===
Pos	Team	Pld	W	D	L	GF	GA	GD	Pts
1	East Bengal (Q)	10	8	2	0	19	2	+17	26
2	Kochin (Q)	10	5	2	3	19	12	+7	17
3	Salgaocar (Q)	10	4	4	2	17	8	+9	16
4	Mahindra & Mahindra	10	3	1	6	13	19	−6	10
5	Indian Telephone Industries	10	2	2	6	6	19	−13	8
6	Indian Bank Recreational Club (R)	10	2	1	7	11	25	−14	7

Source: rsssf.com
(Q) Qualified for the phase indicated; (R) Relegated

== Second stage ==
Pos	Team	Pld	W	D	L	GF	GA	GD	Pts
1	Salgaocar (C)	10	7	2	1	17	6	+11	23
2	East Bengal	10	5	4	1	14	8	+6	19
3	Churchill Brothers	10	4	3	3	12	11	+1	15
4	Mohun Bagan	10	2	4	4	5	10	−5	10
5	JCT	10	1	6	3	8	9	−1	9
6	Kochin	10	0	3	7	3	15	−12	3

Source: rsssf.com
(C) Champions
