= 1997–98 National Football League (India) =

2nd season of National Football League

National Football League
- Season: 1997–98
- Dates: 13 December 1997 – 22 March 1998
- Champions: Mohun Bagan; 1st NFL title 1st Indian title
- Runner up: East Bengal
- Relegated: none
- 1998–99 Asian Club Championship: East Bengal
- 1999–2000 Asian Club Championship: Mohun Bagan
- Top goalscorer: Raman Vijayan (10 goals)

The 1997–98 National Football League, also known as the Philips National League for sponsorship reasons, was the second season of National Football League, the top Indian league for association football clubs, since its inception in 1996.

== Overview ==
It was contested by 10 teams, and Mohun Bagan won the championship.

== League standings ==
Locations of teams in the 1997–98 National Football League

Pos	Team	Pld	W	D	L	GF	GA	GD	Pts
1	Mohun Bagan	18	9	7	2	20	10	+10	34
2	East Bengal	18	8	7	3	18	10	+8	31
3	Salgaocar	18	8	6	4	19	13	+6	30
4	Kochin	18	8	5	5	26	20	+6	29
5	Air India	18	6	8	4	18	16	+2	26
6	Dempo	18	5	7	6	20	22	−2	22
7	JCT	18	4	9	5	19	15	+4	21
8	Indian Bank	18	5	6	7	20	23	−3	21
9	Churchill Brothers	18	4	7	7	20	26	−6	19
10	Mahindra & Mahindra	18	1	2	15	5	30	−25	5

Source: rsssf.com
