= 2009–10 I-League =

3rd season of the I-League

- Season: 2009–10 I-League Season
- Dates: 1 October 2009 – 28 May 2010
- Champions: Dempo; 2nd I-League title 4th Indian title
- Relegated: Sporting Goa; Shillong Lajong
- AFC Champions League: Dempo
- AFC Cup: East Bengal (as Federation Cup Winners)
- Matches: 182
- Top goalscorer: Odafa Onyeka Okolie

The 2009–10 I-League season began on 1 October 2009 with Mahindra United hosting defending champions Churchill Brothers in Mumbai. The season marked the addition of four new teams, with Lajong, Pune, Salgaocar and Viva Kerala were confirmed to participate in the I-League. With the inception of these four clubs, many club transfers have been undergone within India, and around the world. The length of the regular season will be longer than in previous years, with 26 rounds rather than 22.

== Rule changes ==
India became the latest member association to adopt AFC's 3+1 rule which will allow clubs to recruit one player of Asian origin in addition to their regular quota of three foreigners.

The All India Football Federation (AIFF) executive committee decided to embrace the new AFC rule which encourages the mobility of talented Asian players and provides a fillip to the regional game.

== AFC Campaign ==
Two of the I-League teams were playing in the 2010 AFC Cup. This had caused some delays in scheduling. East Bengal lost all its round robin matches and was out of the tournament, but Churchill Brothers were at Knockout stage.

== Stadia and locations ==
Locations of teams in the 2009–10 I-League

Club	Location	Stadium
Churchill Brothers	Goa	Fatorda Stadium
Dempo	Goa	Fatorda Stadium
Sporting Goa	Goa	Fatorda Stadium
Salgaocar	Goa	Fatorda Stadium
Mohun Bagan	Kolkata	Yuva Bharati Krirangan
East Bengal	Kolkata	Yuva Bharati Krirangan
Prayag United	Kolkata	Yuva Bharati Krirangan
Mahindra United	Mumbai	Cooperage Ground
Mumbai	Mumbai	Cooperage Ground
Air India	Mumbai	Cooperage Ground
Pune	Pune	Shree Shiv Chhatrapati Sports Complex
JCT	Phagwara	Guru Gobind Singh Stadium
Shillong Lajong	Shillong	Jawaharlal Nehru Stadium
Viva Kerala	Kozhikode	Municipal Corporation Stadium, Kozhikode

== Managerial changes ==
Team	Outgoing manager	Manner of departure	Incoming manager	Date of appointment	Position in table
Mahindra United	(India) Derrick Pereira	Resigned	(England) David Booth		Pre season
Mumbai	(England) David Booth	Resigned	(India) Khalid Jamil	20 June 2009	Pre season
Shillong Lajong	(India) Herring Shangpliang	Sacked	(India) Stanley Rozario	1 June 2009	Pre season
Salgaocar	(India) Peter Vales	Promoted to technical director	(United States) Tim Hankinson	12 July 2009	Pre season
Sporting Goa	(Nigeria) Clifford Chukwuma	Lacked qualifications	(Portugal) Roy Barreto		Pre season
Churchill Brothers	(Serbia) Zoran Đorđević	Contract Expired	(Brazil) Carlos Roberto Pereira da Silva	3 July 2009	Pre season
Pune	(England) Stewart Hall	Contract Expired			
East Bengal	(India) Subhash Bhowmick	Resigned	(Belgium) Philippe De Ridder		12
Sporting Goa	(Portugal) Roy Barreto	Resigned	(India) Vishwas Goankar	14 December 2009.	14
Air India	(India) Bimal Ghosh	Resigned	(India) Yusuf Ansari	8 January 2010.	12
Mohun Bagan	(Morocco) Karim Bencherifa	Sacked	(India) Satyajit Chatterjee		7
Salgaocar	(United States) Tim Hankinson	Sacked	(Morocco) Karim Bencherifa		
Mohun Bagan	(India) Satyajit Chatterjee	Resignation	(India) Biswajit Bhattacharjee	1 April 2010	5

== League table ==
Pos	Team	Pld	W	D	L	GF	GA	GD	Pts	Qualification or relegation
1	Dempo (C)	26	16	6	4	54	31	+23	54	2011 AFC Champions League playoff
2	Churchill Brothers	26	11	10	5	51	35	+16	43	
3	Pune	26	10	12	4	38	23	+15	42	
4	Mahindra United	26	10	11	5	45	29	+16	41	Disbanded
5	Mohun Bagan	26	10	6	10	48	43	+5	36	
6	Salgaocar	26	8	9	9	34	38	−4	33	
7	JCT	26	8	8	10	26	29	−3	32	
8	Prayag United	26	8	8	10	33	39	−6	32	
9	East Bengal	26	7	10	9	27	31	−4	31	2011 AFC Cup group stage (Note: East Bengal qualified for the 2011 AFC Cup as 2010 Indian Federation Cup winners.)
10	Viva Kerala	26	7	9	10	25	36	−11	30	
11	Mumbai	26	6	11	9	24	26	−2	29	
12	Air India	26	7	7	12	28	47	−19	28	
13	Sporting Goa	26	6	9	11	30	40	−10	27	Relegation to 2011 I-League 2nd Division
14	Shillong Lajong	26	6	8	12	23	39	−16	26	Relegation to 2011 I-League 2nd Division

Source: Soccerway
Rules for classification: 1) points; 2) goal difference; 3) number of goals scored.
(C) Champions

== Fixtures and results ==
Home \ Away	CB	DEM	MAH	SCG	MB	EB	MUM	PRY	JCT	AI	SLFC	PFC	VK	SFC
Churchill Brothers		3–2	1–4	0–0	4–0	2–2	1–1	2–0	6–0	5–1	1–0	1–1	2–0	3–1
Dempo	4–2		2–2	3–1	3–1	0–0	3–2	3–1	2–1	2–0	4–1	1–1	3–1	1–1
Mahindra United	1–1	3–1		2–1	1–2	3–2	0–0	2–2	2–1	2–1	5–0	1–1	1–1	1–2
Sporting Goa	2–1	1–2	3–2		2–2	0–1	2–2	1–1	1–0	1–2	0–1	2–2	1–2	2–3
Mohun Bagan	2–2	1–4	3–1	1–2		2–1	1–2	2–3	1–2	4–0	1–4	0–0	2–0	1–1
East Bengal	3–2	0–1	1–1	1–1	3–5		1–0	2–1	0–0	0–2	3–0	1–2	1–1	1–1
Mumbai	0–0	1–3	0–0	0–0	2–0	0–0		0–2	2–0	0–0	3–1	1–2	0–1	2–1
Prayag United	2–4	1–1	0–1	0–1	1–5	1–0	2–1		1–1	3–3	2–0	1–1	1–1	2–0
JCT	1–1	1–2	0–0	2–0	0–0	1–1	1–0	1–0		0–2	5–1	1–2	5–1	1–1
Air India	2–3	1–3	0–4	1–1	0–5	0–1	2–2	3–1	0–1		1–1	1–0	1–1	2–1
Shillong Lajong	0–0	0–1	2–1	0–0	1–2	1–0	1–1	1–1	0–1	3–0		1–0	1–1	0–0
Pune	4–1	1–1	0–0	4–0	1–3	0–0	1–1	2–1	2–0	0–1	1–1		3–1	1–1
Viva Kerala	1–1	1–0	1–1	4–2	1–1	0–1	0–1	0–1	1–0	2–1	2–1	0–3		1–1
Salgaocar	1–2	3–2	1–4	1–3	2–1	4–1	1–0	1–2	0–0	1–1	3–1	1–3	1–0	

Updated to match(es) played on 28 May 2010. Source: indianfootball.com
Legend: Blue = home team win; Yellow = draw; Red = away team win.

== Top goalscorers ==
As of 18 May 2010 (season end)

21 goals

- (Nigeria) Odafa Onyeka Okolie (Churchill Brothers)

16 goals

- (Nigeria) Muritala Ali (Mahindra United)
- (Brazil) Josimar (Chirag United Kerala)
- (Nigeria) Ekene Ikenwa (Salgaocar)

15 goals

- (Nigeria) Ranty Martins (Dempo)

14 goals

- (Brazil) Edmar Figueira (Pune)
- (Nigeria) N.D.Opara (Air India)
- (India) Mohammed Rafi (Mahindra United)
- (Brazil) Jose Ramirez Barreto (Mohun Bagan)

12 goals

- (Nigeria) Chidi Edeh (Mohun Bagan)
- (Brazil) Edmilson (Chirag United Kerala)

11 goals

- (Nigeria) Felix Chimaokwu (Churchill Brothers)

10 goals

- (Japan) Arata Izumi (Pune)
- (Nigeria) Junior Obagbemiro (Sporting Goa)

=== Hat tricks ===
Player	For	Against	Result	Date
(Nigeria) Odafa Onyeka Okolie	Churchill Brothers	Chirag United Kerala	4–2	2010-3-07
(Nigeria) Muritala Ali	Mahindra United	Air India	4–0	2009-11-12
(Nigeria) Muritala Ali	Mahindra United	Salgaocar	4–1	2009-10-18
(India) Baljit Singh Sahni	JCT	Shillong Lajong	5–1	2009-10-4

== See also ==
- 2009 IFA Shield
- 2009 Durand Cup
- I-League 2nd Division 2010
