= 1999–2000 National Football League (India) =

4th season of National Football League

National Football League
- Season: 1999–2000
- Dates: 9 December 1999 – 26 March 2000
- Champions: Mohun Bagan; 2nd NFL title 2nd Indian title
- Runner up: Churchill Brothers
- Relegated: Border Security Force; Dempo
- Asian Club Championship: none
- Top goalscorer: Igor Shkvyrin (11 goals)
- Biggest home win: Churchill Brothers 5–0 Dempo
- Biggest away win: Dempo 1–7 Mahindra & Mahindra

The 1999–2000 National Football League, also known as the Coca-Cola National Football League for sponsorship reasons, was the fourth season of National Football League, the top Indian league for association football clubs, since its inception in 1996.

== Overview ==
It was contested by 12 teams, and Mohun Bagan won the championship under the coach Subrata Bhattacharya. This is their second National Football League title. Churchill Brothers came second and Salgaonkar came third. For the first time, the tournament was played without any group stage (as that was followed in previous seasons) and in "Home and Away" system. Dempo and BSF (Border Security Force) were relegated from the National Football League.

== League standings ==
Locations of teams in the 1999–00 National Football League

| Pos | Team | Pld | W | D | L | GF | GA | GD | Pts |
|---|---|---|---|---|---|---|---|---|---|
| 1 | Mohun Bagan | 22 | 14 | 5 | 3 | 36 | 17 | +19 | 47 |
| 2 | Churchill Brothers | 22 | 12 | 5 | 5 | 36 | 17 | +19 | 41 |
| 3 | Salgaocar | 22 | 11 | 6 | 5 | 26 | 15 | +11 | 39 |
| 4 | Kochin | 22 | 9 | 7 | 6 | 27 | 21 | +6 | 34 |
| 5 | JCT | 22 | 9 | 7 | 6 | 20 | 18 | +2 | 34 |
| 6 | Mahindra & Mahindra | 22 | 8 | 9 | 5 | 26 | 16 | +10 | 33 |
| 7 | East Bengal | 22 | 8 | 8 | 6 | 25 | 21 | +4 | 32 |
| 8 | Tollygunge Agragami | 22 | 6 | 8 | 8 | 18 | 27 | −9 | 26 |
| 9 | State Bank of Travancore | 22 | 7 | 3 | 12 | 20 | 34 | −14 | 24 |
| 10 | Indian Telephone Industries | 22 | 3 | 9 | 10 | 18 | 27 | −9 | 18 |
| 11 | Border Security Force | 22 | 4 | 5 | 13 | 9 | 23 | −14 | 17 |
| 12 | Dempo | 22 | 1 | 8 | 13 | 9 | 34 | −25 | 11 |

Source: rsssf.com
