= 2003–04 National Football League (India) =

8th season of National Football League

National Football League
- Season: 2003–04
- Dates: 28 November 2003 – 14 May 2004
- Champions: East Bengal; 3rd NFL title 3rd Indian title
- Runner up: Dempo
- Relegated: Mohammedan Sporting; Indian Bank
- AFC Cup: East Bengal; Dempo
- Top goalscorer: Cristiano Júnior (15 goals)
- Biggest home win: East Bengal 4–0 Mohammedan Sporting (16 January 2004); Vasco 5–1 Mohun Bagan (16 April 2004)
- Biggest away win: Mohammedan Sporting 1–5 Mahindra United (17 March 2004)

The 2003–04 National Football League was the eighth season of National Football League, the top Indian league for association football clubs, since its inception in 1996.

== Overview ==
The fixtures for the first phase of the season (till round 11) were announced on 20 November 2003. It was contested by 12 teams, Mohammedan SC and Sporting Club De Goa were promoted from NFL2. East Bengal won the championship, in the month of April under the coach Subhas Bhowmick. Dempo came second and Mahindra came third. Indian Bank and Mohammedan were relegated from the National Football League next season.

== League standings ==
Locations of teams in the 2003–04 National Football League

| Pos | Team | Pld | W | D | L | GF | GA | GD | Pts |
|---|---|---|---|---|---|---|---|---|---|
| 1 | East Bengal (C) | 22 | 15 | 4 | 3 | 37 | 13 | +24 | 49 |
| 2 | Dempo | 22 | 12 | 9 | 1 | 28 | 12 | +16 | 45 |
| 3 | Mahindra United | 22 | 12 | 5 | 5 | 34 | 21 | +13 | 41 |
| 4 | Churchill Brothers | 22 | 10 | 6 | 6 | 29 | 24 | +5 | 36 |
| 5 | JCT Mills | 22 | 8 | 9 | 5 | 23 | 21 | +2 | 33 |
| 6 | Vasco | 22 | 6 | 10 | 6 | 22 | 19 | +3 | 28 |
| 7 | Salgaocar | 22 | 7 | 6 | 9 | 24 | 23 | +1 | 27 |
| 8 | Sporting Goa | 22 | 7 | 6 | 9 | 34 | 35 | −1 | 27 |
| 9 | Mohun Bagan | 22 | 6 | 6 | 10 | 22 | 23 | −1 | 24 |
| 10 | Tollygunge Agragami | 22 | 4 | 8 | 10 | 16 | 24 | −8 | 20 |
| 11 | Mohammedan Sporting (R) | 22 | 4 | 7 | 11 | 20 | 39 | −19 | 19 |
| 12 | Indian Bank (R) | 22 | 2 | 2 | 18 | 15 | 50 | −35 | 8 |

Source: rsssf.com
(C) Champions; (R) Relegated

== Season statistics ==
=== Top scorers ===
| Rank | Player | Club | Goals |
|---|---|---|---|
| 1 | (Brazil) Cristiano Júnior | East Bengal | 15 |
| 2 | (Ghana) Yusif Yakubu | Churchill Brothers | 14 |
| 3 | (Nigeria) Dudu Omagbemi | Mohammedan Sporting | 13 |
| 4 | (India) Bhaichung Bhutia | East Bengal | 12 |
| 5 | (Nigeria) Abdul Seriki | Mohammedan Sporting | 11 |
| 6 | (Liberia) Sunday Seah | Dempo | 9 |
| 7 | (India) Abhishek Yadav | Mahindra United | 7 |
| 7 | (India) Harvinder Singh | JCT Mills | 7 |

=== Hat-tricks ===
| Player | For | Against | Result | Date | Ref. |
|---|---|---|---|---|---|
| Ashim Biswas | Mohun Bagan | Indian Bank | 3–0 (H) | 15 December 2003 | |
| Yusif Yakubu | Churchill Brothers | Indian Bank | 4–1 (H) | 5 March 2004 | |
| Felix Aboagye | Mahindra United | Mohammedan Sporting | 5–1 (A) | 17 March 2004 | |
| Dudu Omagbemi | Sporting Clube | Indian Bank | 4–1 (H) | 5 April 2004 | |
| Marcos Pereira | Vasco | Mohun Bagan | 5–1 (H) | 16 April 2004 | |

Note: (H) – Home; (A) – Away
