= 2004–05 National Football League (India) =

9th season of National Football League

National Football League
- Season: 2004–05
- Dates: 12 January – 21 May 2005
- Champions: Dempo; 1st NFL title 1st Indian title
- Runner up: Sporting Goa
- Relegated: Churchill Brothers; Vasco; State Bank of Travancore; Tollygunge Agragami
- AFC Cup: Dempo; Mahindra United
- Top goalscorer: Dudu Omagbemi (21 goals)
- Biggest home win: East Bengal 5–0 Tollygunge Agragami (15 February 2005); Vasco 5–0 Tollygunge Agragami (23 March 2005)
- Biggest away win: Dempo 0–4 Sporting Goa (16 March 2005); Churchill Brothers 0–4 Sporting Goa (31 March 2005); Tollygunge Agragami 0–4 Mohun Bagan (5 May 2005)
- Highest scoring: Salgaocar 3–4 State Bank of Travancore (14 January 2005); Sporting Goa 5–2 Vasco (29 April 2005)

The 2004–05 National Football League was the ninth season of the National Football League, the top Indian professional league for association football clubs, since its inception in 1996. 12 teams took part in the season. Dempo won the league by scoring 47 points in 22 matches. Sporting Goa won the second position by scoring 45 points in 22 matches. Dudu Omagbemi of Sporting Clube de Goa was the highest goal scorer of the league (21).

== Overview ==
It was contested by 12 teams,State Bank of Travancore (SBT) and Fransa FC were promoted from NFL 2. Dempo won the championship and this was their first title. Sporting Goa came second and East Bengal came third. Churchill Brothers Sc, Vasco S C, State Bank of Travancore (SBT) and Tollygunge Agragami were relegated from the National Football League -2.

== League standings ==
Locations of teams in the 2004–05 National Football League

| Pos | Team | Pld | W | D | L | GF | GA | GD | Pts |
|---|---|---|---|---|---|---|---|---|---|
| 1 | Dempo (C) | 22 | 14 | 5 | 3 | 28 | 17 | +11 | 47 |
| 2 | Sporting Goa | 22 | 14 | 3 | 5 | 46 | 23 | +23 | 45 |
| 3 | East Bengal | 22 | 13 | 4 | 5 | 34 | 16 | +18 | 43 |
| 4 | Mahindra United | 22 | 8 | 11 | 3 | 29 | 21 | +8 | 35 |
| 5 | Fransa Pax | 22 | 8 | 6 | 8 | 24 | 26 | −2 | 30 |
| 6 | Salgaocar | 22 | 7 | 7 | 8 | 26 | 24 | +2 | 28 |
| 7 | JCT Mills | 22 | 7 | 7 | 8 | 19 | 19 | 0 | 28 |
| 8 | Mohun Bagan | 22 | 5 | 8 | 9 | 16 | 19 | −3 | 23 |
| 9 | Churchill Brothers (R) | 22 | 5 | 8 | 9 | 23 | 33 | −10 | 23 |
| 10 | Vasco (R) | 22 | 5 | 5 | 12 | 25 | 37 | −12 | 20 |
| 11 | SBT Kerala (R) | 22 | 4 | 6 | 12 | 24 | 34 | −10 | 18 |
| 12 | Tollygunge Agragami (R) | 22 | 3 | 8 | 11 | 20 | 45 | −25 | 17 |

Source: rsssf.com
(C) Champions; (R) Relegated

== Season awards ==
The following awards were given at the conclusion of the season. Dudu Omagbemi of Sporting Clube, who scored 21 goals, was named the best player and best forward for the season.

| Award | Recipient | Club |
|---|---|---|
| Best Player | Dudu Omagbemi | Sporting Goa |
| Best Forward | Dudu Omagbemi | Sporting Goa |
| Best Midfielder | Climax Lawrence | East Bengal |
| Best Goalkeeper | Satish Kumar | Dempo |
| Best Defender | Mahesh Gawli | Mahindra United |
| Fair Play | JCT Mills | |
