= 2007–08 I-League =

1st season of the I-League

- Season: 2007–08 I-League Season
- Dates: 24 November 2007 – 19 May 2008
- Champions: Dempo; 1st I-League title 3rd Indian title
- Relegated: Viva Kerala; Salgaocar
- AFC Champions League: Dempo
- AFC Cup: Mohun Bagan (as Federation Cup Winners)
- Matches: 90
- Top goalscorer: Odafa Onyeka Okolie

The 2007–08 I-League kicked off on 24 November 2007 at the Fatorda Stadium, Margao, Goa. The first match of the season was played between the two Goan clubs Dempo and Salgaocar.

The top team in the I-League qualified for the qualifying phase of the 2009 AFC Champions League, while the bottom two teams were relegated to I-League 2nd Division in the next season.

== Introduction ==
After the 2006–07 NFL season, it was announced that it would be rebranded as the I-League for the 2007–08 season. The league's first season consisted of eight teams from the previous NFL campaign and two teams from the 2nd Division to form a 10 team league. Oil and Natural Gas Corporation (ONGC), the title sponsors of the previous NFL, were named as the title sponsors of the I-League before the league kicked off in November 2007. The league also announced a change in their foreign-player restrictions with the new rule being that all the clubs could sign four foreigners – three non-Asian and one which must be Asian. The league also announced that, for the first season, matches will be broadcast on Zee Sports.

== Over view ==
The league was contested by 10 teams, Viva Kerala and Salgaocar SC were promoted from NFL - 2. Dempo winning the championship. This victory marked their first ileague and third national league title. Churchill Brothers FC secured the second position, while JCT came third. Viva Kerala and Salgaocar SC were relegated to I-league 2.

== Teams ==
Locations of games played in the 2007-08 I-League

Club	Manager	Location	Stadia
Air India	(India) Bimal Ghosh	Mumbai	Cooperage Ground
Churchill Brothers	(Morocco) Karim Bencherifa	Goa	Jawaharlal Nehru - Fatorda Stadium
Dempo	(India) Armando Colaco	Goa	Jawaharlal Nehru - Fatorda Stadium
East Bengal	(India) Manoranjan Bhattacharjee	Kolkata	Salt Lake Stadium
JCT	(India) Sukhwinder Singh	New Delhi & Ludhiana	Ambedkar Stadium & Guru Gobind Singh Stadium
Mahindra United	(India) Derrick Pereira	Mumbai	Cooperage Ground
Mohun Bagan	(Brazil) Carlos Roberto Pereira Da Silva	Kolkata	Salt Lake Stadium
Salgaocar	(India) Savio Medeira	Goa	Jawaharlal Nehru - Fatorda Stadium
Sporting Goa	(Nigeria) Clifford Chukwuma	Goa	Jawaharlal Nehru - Fatorda Stadium
Viva Kerala	(India) A.M.Sreedharan	Kozhikode	Kozhikode EMS Corporation Stadium

== Standings ==
=== League table ===
Pos	Team	Pld	W	D	L	GF	GA	GD	Pts	Qualification or relegation
1	Dempo (C)	18	10	6	2	35	13	+22	36	2009 AFC Champions League
2	Churchill Brothers	18	11	3	4	40	22	+18	36	
3	JCT	18	9	6	3	31	14	+17	33	
4	Mohun Bagan	18	8	6	4	22	17	+5	30	2009 AFC Cup group stage (Note: Mohun Bagan qualified for the 2009 AFC Cup as 2008 Indian Federation Cup winners.)
5	Mahindra United	18	7	7	4	24	18	+6	28	
6	East Bengal	18	5	4	9	17	23	−6	19	
7	Sporting Goa	18	4	7	7	14	24	−10	19	
8	Air India	18	3	8	7	10	20	−10	17	
9	Viva Kerala (R)	18	3	3	12	13	38	−25	12	Relegation to 2009 I-League 2nd Division
10	Salgaocar (R)	18	1	8	9	20	37	−17	11	Relegation to 2009 I-League 2nd Division

Source: Soccerway
Rules for classification: 1) points; 2) goal difference; 3) number of goals scored.
(C) Champions; (R) Relegated

== Results ==
Home \ Away	AI	CB	DEM	EB	JCT	MAH	MB	SFC	SCG	VK
Air India		0–0	1–4	1–0	0–0	0–1	0–0	2–1	1–0	1–1
Churchill Brothers	3–0		0–2	3–2	1–0	4–2	2–2	2–1	3–0	5–0
Dempo	0–0	4–1		2–2	2–1	1–1	2–0	3–0	4–1	4–0
East Bengal	0–0	0–1	1–0		1–3	1–0	0–2	3–2	1–1	2–0
JCT	2–0	3–0	0–0	3–0		0–0	1–1	4–0	4–2	2–0
Mahindra United	1–1	1–5	3–1	2–1	3–1		0–0	2–2	3–0	0–0
Mohun Bagan	2–0	2–1	0–0	1–0	1–2	1–0		1–0	1–1	1–3
Salgaocar	1–1	1–5	1–1	0–0	3–3	0–0	4–5		1–1	1–0
Sporting Goa	1–0	1–1	0–1	1–0	0–0	0–3	1–0	1–1		3–0
Viva Kerala	3–2	1–3	1–4	1–3	0–2	0–2	0–2	3–1	0–0	

Source: Soccerway
Legend: Blue = home team win; Yellow = draw; Red = away team win.

== Top goalscorers ==
Last updated: 23 February 2008

Ref:

Rank	Name	Team	Goals
1	(Nigeria) Odafe Onyeka Okolie	Churchill Brothers	22
2	(Brazil) Eduardo da Silva Escobar	JCT	14
3	(Democratic Republic of the Congo) Mboyo Iyomi	Churchill Brothers	12
3	(Nigeria) Ranty Martins Soleye	Dempo	12
5	(India) Baichung Bhutia	Mohun Bagan	10
6	(Brazil) Edmilson Marques Pardal	East Bengal	8
6	(Nigeria) Chidi Edeh	Dempo	8
8	(Nigeria) Felix Chimaokwu	Salgaocar	7
8	(India) Sunil Chhetri	JCT	7
10	(Nigeria) Junior Obagbemiro	Sporting Goa	6
10	(Ghana) Andrews Pomeyie Mensah	Mahindra United	6
12	(Ghana) Wisdom Abbey	Viva Kerala	5
12	(Brazil) Jose Ramirez Barreto	Mohun Bagan	5
12	(Ghana) Yusif Yakubu	Mahindra United	5
12	(Brazil) Roberto Mendes Silva	Dempo	5
16	(Ghana) Bashiree Mohammed Abbas	Air India	4
