= 2005–06 East Bengal FC season =

Indian football club season

East Bengal
2005–06 season
- President: Dr Pranab Dasgupta
- Head-Coach: (India) Subhash Bhowmick (until 2 December 2005) (India) Bikash Panji (Note: Caretaker manager after Subhash Bhowmick was sacked for legal reasons.) (until 15 December 2005) (Belgium) Philippe De Ridder (from 15 December 2005)
- Ground: Salt Lake Stadium; East Bengal Ground
- National Football League: Runners-up
- Calcutta Football League: Runners-up
- Federation Cup: Quarter-Finals
- IFA Shield: Group Stage
- Durand Cup: Group Stage
- Super Cup: Champions
- Top goalscorer: League: Bhaichung Bhutia (12); All: Bhaichung Bhutia (12)
Home colours	Away colours

The 2005–06 season was East Bengal's 10th season in the National Football League and 86th season in existence.

== Competitions ==
=== Overall ===
Competition	First match	Last match	Final position
Calcutta Football League	31 July 2005	30 September 2005	Runners-Up
Federation Cup	19 October 2005	23 October 2005	Quarter-Finals
IFA Shield	24 November 2005	1 December 2005	Semi-Finals
Durand Cup	11 December 2005	13 December 2005	Group Stage
National Football League	10 January 2006	15 May 2006	Runners-Up
Super Cup	27 May 2006		Champions

=== Overview ===
Competition	Record							
Competition	Pld	W	D	L	GF	GA	GD	Win %
Calcutta Football League	14	11	1	2	25	7	+18	78.57
Federation Cup	2	1	1	0	3	1	+2	50.00
IFA Shield	3	1	0	2	7	6	+1	33.33
Durand Cup	2	1	0	1	3	2	+1	50.00
National Football League	17	9	4	4	25	16	+9	52.94
Super Cup	1	1	0	0	2	1	+1	100.00
Total	39	24	6	9	65	33	+32	61.54

Last updated: 1 June 2006
Source: Competitions

=== Calcutta Football League ===
East Bengal finished the 2005 Calcutta Premier Division as runner-up with 34 points from 14 matches, 6 points behind champions Mohun Bagan.

==== Fixtures & results ====
Win Draw Loss

31 July 2005 1	East Bengal	0–0	EverReady	Kolkata
		Report		Stadium: East Bengal Ground

5 August 2005 2	East Bengal	2–1	Tollygunge Agragami	Kolkata
	Syed Rahim Nabi 70', 88'	Report	Sheikh Azim 80'	Stadium: East Bengal Ground

9 August 2005 3	East Bengal	3–0	Calcutta Port Trust	Kolkata
	Saumik Dey 78'; Dipankar Roy 85'; Sasthi Duley 89'	Report		Stadium: East Bengal Ground

14 August 2005 4	East Bengal	2–1	Mohammedan Sporting	Kolkata
	Syed Rahim Nabi 73', 90'	Report	Suman Datta 36'	Stadium: Salt Lake Stadium

18 August 2005 5	East Bengal	0–1	Mohun Bagan	Kolkata
		Report	Gley Yao Rodrigue 17'	Stadium: Salt Lake Stadium; Referee: (England) Dave Roberts

22 August 2005 6	East Bengal	4–0	Eastern Railway	Kolkata
	I.M. Vijayan 26', 58'; Alvito D'Cunha 53'; Syed Rahim Nabi 65'	Report		Stadium: East Bengal Ground

25 August 2005 7	East Bengal	2–0	George Telegraph	Kolkata
	I.M. Vijayan 11'; Shylo Malsawmtluanga 87'	Report		Stadium: East Bengal Ground

3 September 2005 8	Mohun Bagan	1–0	East Bengal	Kolkata
	Gley Yao Rodrigue 42'	Report		Stadium: Salt Lake Stadium; Referee: (India) Subrata Sarkar

8 September 2005 9	EverReady	1–2	East Bengal	Kolkata
	Snehashis Chakroborty 66'	Report	Syed Rahim Nabi 29'; Shylo Malsawmtluanga 70'	Stadium: East Bengal Ground

13 September 2005 10	Tollygunge Agragami	1–3	East Bengal	Kolkata
	Prasanta Chakraborty 44'	Report	Manoj Das 3' (o.g.); Bernard Pires 19'; RC Prakash 89'	Stadium: East Bengal Ground

17 September 2005 11	Mohammedan Sporting	0–3	East Bengal	Kolkata
		Report	Arun Malhotra 4'; Alvito D'Cunha 54'; Syed Rahim Nabi 67'	Stadium: Salt Lake Stadium

22 September 2005 12	Calcutta Port Trust	1–2	East Bengal	Kolkata
	Srimanta Das 88'	Report	Kalia Kulothungan 80'; Syed Rahim Nabi 81'	Stadium: East Bengal Ground

27 September 2005 13	George Telegraph	0–1	East Bengal	Kolkata
		Report	Mike Okoro 47'	Stadium: East Bengal Ground

30 September 2005 14	Eastern Railway	0–1	East Bengal	Kolkata
		Report	Gouranga Datta 73'	Stadium: East Bengal Ground

=== Federation Cup ===
East Bengal started the Federation Cup campaign in the Pre-Quarter Finals against Air India and won 3–1 with goals from Sydney Nkalanga, Dipankar Roy and Mike Okoro. Syed Rahim Nabi scored an own-goal in the dying minutes to give consolation to Air India. In the quarter-final, however, East Bengal lost to Churchill Brothers in the sudden-death after the game ended 0–0 after 120 minutes.

==== Fixtures & results ====
Win Draw Loss

19 October 2005 Pre-Quarter Final	East Bengal	3–1	Air India	Margao
	Sydney Nkalanga 9'; Dipankar Roy 44'; Mike Okoro 58'	Report	Syed Rahim Nabi 90+1' (o.g.)	Stadium: Fatorda Stadium; Man of the Match: Mike Okoro (East Bengal).

23 October 2005 Quarter-Final	East Bengal	0–0 (a.e.t.) (9–10 p)	Churchill Brothers	Margao
		Report		Stadium: Fatorda Stadium; Referee: S Suresh
	Penalties
	Mike Okoro (penalty scored); Liswa Nduti (penalty scored); Jatin Singh (penalty scored); Sydney Nkalanga (penalty scored); Syed Rahim Nabi (penalty scored); Covan Lawrence (penalty scored); Muttah Suresh (penalty scored); Saumik Dey (penalty scored); I.M. Vijayan (penalty scored); Kalia Kulothungan (penalty missed)		(penalty scored) Jotin Singh; (penalty scored) Syed Hussain; (penalty scored) Sony P T; (penalty scored) Vanlalrova; (penalty scored) Ngozi Tony; (penalty scored) Chitra Singh; (penalty scored) Vinay Singh; (penalty scored) Villroy D'Cruz; (penalty scored) Amjad Hussain; (penalty scored) Abba Muritala

=== IFA Shield ===
Group A

Team	Pld	W	D	L	GF	GA	GD	Pts
(India) East Bengal	2	1	0	1	6	4	+2	3
(India) Mohammedan Sporting	2	1	0	1	3	3	0	3
(India) Mohun Bagan	2	1	0	1	2	4	−2	3

Source: 111th IFA Shield 2005

East Bengal was grouped alongside the other two Kolkata Giants Mohun Bagan and Mohammedan Sporting in Group A. East Bengal lost 2–3 against Mohammedan Sporting in the opening game. However, in the second game, against arch-rivals Mohun Bagan, East Bengal registered a 4–1 win with goals from Chandan Das, Mike Okoro and a brace from Alvito D'Cunha. In the semi-finals, East Bengal faced EverReady and surprisingly lost 2–1 with Chibueze Francis Maduako scoring a brace for EverReady after Kalia Kulothungan put East Bengal ahead in the 3rd minute.

==== Fixtures & results ====
Win Draw Loss

24 November 2005 Group Stage	East Bengal	2–3	Mohammedan Sporting	Kolkata
	Chandan Das 66'; Shylo Malsawmtluanga 86'	Report	Okonji Onyelo Patrick 42'; Satyajit Bose 69'; Mputu Bolwe 77'	Stadium: Salt Lake Stadium; Referee: S Suresh; Man of the Match: Patrick Okonji Onyelo (Md Sporting)

27 November 2005 Group Stage	East Bengal	4–1	Mohun Bagan	Kolkata
	Chandan Das 9'; Mike Okoro 29'; Alvito D'Cunha 43', 90+3'	Report	Akeem Abul Alem 14'	Stadium: Salt Lake Stadium; Referee: Subrata Sarkar; Man of the Match: Alvito D'Cunha (East Bengal)

1 December 2005 Semi-Final	East Bengal	1–2	EverReady	Kolkata
	Kalia Kulothungan 3'	Report	Chibueze Francis Maduako 24', 90+2'	Stadium: Salt Lake Stadium; Referee: S. Suresh; Man of the Match: Chibueze Francis Maduako (EverReady)

=== Durand Cup ===
Group D

Team	Pld	W	D	L	GF	GA	GD	Pts
(India) JCT	2	2	0	0	6	1	+5	6
(India) East Bengal	2	1	0	1	3	2	+1	3
(India) HAL	2	0	0	2	0	6	−6	0

Source: 118th Durand Cup 2005

East Bengal was grouped alongside JCT and HAL in Group D. East Bengal won 2–0 against HAL in the opening fixture withgoals from RC Prakash and Jatin Singh Bisht. However, they lost 1–2 against JCT as they were eliminated from the group stages.

==== Fixtures & results ====
Win Draw Loss

11 December 2005 Group Stage	East Bengal	2–0	HAL	Delhi
	RC Prakash 7'; Jatin Singh Bisht 22'	Report		Stadium: Ambedkar Stadium

13 December 2005 Group Stage	East Bengal	1–2	JCT	Delhi
	Mike Okoro 57'	Report	Parveen Kumar 33'; Renedy Singh 63'	Stadium: Ambedkar Stadium

=== National Football League ===
==== League table ====
Pos	Team	Pld	W	D	L	GF	GA	GD	Pts	Qualification
1	Mahindra United	17	11	3	3	27	13	+14	36	Champions
2	East Bengal	17	9	4	4	25	16	+9	31	
3	Mohun Bagan	17	8	6	3	17	10	+7	30	
4	Sporting Goa	17	6	7	4	24	16	+8	25	
5	Dempo	17	6	7	4	29	22	+7	25	

Source: 10th National Football League

==== Fixtures & results ====
Win Draw Loss Void

10 January 2006 1	East Bengal	1–0	Mohammedan Sporting	Kolkata
	Bhaichung Bhutia 78'	Report		Stadium: Salt Lake Stadium; Referee: S Suresh; Man of the Match: Bhaichung Bhutia (East Bengal)

15 January 2006 2	East Bengal	1–1	Salgaocar	Kolkata
	Bhaichung Bhutia 33'	Report	Fabio dos Passos 60'	Stadium: Salt Lake Stadium; Referee: Deepak Kumar Dey; Man of the Match: Fabio dos Passos (Salgaocar)

22 January 2006 3	Mohun Bagan	0–0	East Bengal	Kolkata
		Report		Stadium: Salt Lake Stadium; Referee: Rizwan Ul Haq; Man of the Match: Bhaichung Bhutia (East Bengal)

25 January 2006 4	East Bengal	2–0	Fransa-Pax	Kolkata
	Mike Okoro 8'; Bhaichung Bhutia 82'	Report		Stadium: Salt Lake Stadium; Referee: Dinesh Nair; Man of the Match: Bhaichung Bhutia (East Bengal)

29 January 2006 5	East Bengal	0–0	Air India	Kolkata
		Report		Stadium: Salt Lake Stadium; Referee: Syed Sujauddin / Dinesh Nair (Note: replaced in 2nd Half due to illness.); Man of the Match: Ndem Guy Herve (East Bengal)

2 February 2006 6	JCT	0–1	East Bengal	Ludhiana
		Report	Narinder Singh 9' (o.g.)	Stadium: Guru Nanak Stadium; Referee: Deepak Bisht; Man of the Match: Sunil Chhetri (JCT)

6 February 2006 7	East Bengal	0–1	Mahindra United	Kolkata
		Report	Jose Ramirez Barreto 68'	Stadium: Salt Lake Stadium; Referee: Dinesh Nair; Man of the Match: James Lukram Singh (Mahindra)

18 March 2006 8	East Bengal	4–3	Sporting Club de Goa	Kolkata
	Bhaichung Bhutia 30', 60', 87'; Syed Rahim Nabi 65'	Report	Hardip Singh Saini 45'; Chidi Edeh 55'; Bibiano Fernandes 86'	Stadium: Salt Lake Stadium; Referee: Komaleeswaran Shankar; Man of the Match: Bhaichung Bhutia (East Bengal)

26 March 2006 9	East Bengal	5–3	Dempo	Kolkata
	Ndem Guy Herve 13'; Bhaichung Bhutia 24'; Debabrata Roy 69', 77'; Syed Rahim Nabi 71'	Report	Majekodumni Bolaji 34'; Ranti Martins 76' (pen.), 85'	Stadium: Salt Lake Stadium; Referee: N Mohan; Man of the Match: Debabrata Roy (East Bengal)

2 April 2006 10	Mohammedan Sporting	0–2	East Bengal	Kolkata
		Report	Ndem Guy Herve 2'; Bhaichung Bhutia 54'	Stadium: Salt Lake Stadium; Referee: N Mohan; Man of the Match: Ndem Guy Herve (East Bengal)

8 April 2006 11	East Bengal	3–1	Mohun Bagan	Kolkata
	Bhaichung Bhutia 48'; Shylo Malsawmtluanga 62'; Gouranga Datta 89'	Report	Dharamjit Singh (red card) 30'; Mehtab Hossain 72'	Stadium: Salt Lake Stadium; Referee: P.K. Bose; Man of the Match: Alvito D'Cunha (East Bengal)

16 April 2006 12	Dempo	1–3	East Bengal	Margao
	Johnny D'Cruz 35'	Report	Bhaichung Bhutia 63'; Syed Rahim Nabi 71'; Dipankar Roy 85'	Stadium: Fatorda Stadium; Referee: N Mohan; Man of the Match: Syed Rahim Nabi (East Bengal)

20 April 2006 13	Mahindra United	1–0	East Bengal	Mumbai
	Yusif Yakubu 45+1' (pen.)	Report		Stadium: Cooperage Ground; Referee: Pradip Kuma; Man of the Match: Irungbam Surkumar Singh (Mahindra United)

23 April 2006 14	Air India	1–1	East Bengal	Mumbai
	Vijith Shetty 17'	Report	Bhaichung Bhutia 29'	Stadium: Cooperage Ground; Referee: Abdul Saleem; Man of the Match: Paresh Shivalkar (Air-India)

30 April 2006 15	Salgaocar	1–0	East Bengal	Margao
	Micky Fernandes 81'	Report		Stadium: Fatorda Stadium; Referee: N Mohan; Man of the Match: Micky Fernandes (Salgaocar)

8 May 2006 16	Sporting Club de Goa	3–1	East Bengal	Margao
	Chidi Edeh 11'; Hardip Singh Saini 33'; Dudu Omagbemi 35'	Report	Bhaichung Bhutia 28'	Stadium: Fatorda Stadium; Referee: P Bhaskar; Man of the Match: Hardip Singh Saini (Sporting Clube)

15 May 2006 17	East Bengal	1–0	JCT	Kolkata
	Jayanta Sen 25'	Report		Stadium: Salt Lake Stadium; Referee: A Arjunan; Man of the Match: Jayanta Sen (East Bengal)

21 May 2006 18	Fransa-Pax	n/p	East Bengal	Margao
				Stadium: Fatorda Stadium
Note: Fransa-Pax team withdrew from the National League midway.

=== Super Cup ===
Since Mahindra United won both the 2005-06 National Football League and the 2005 Federation Cup, National League runner-up East Bengal faced them in the 2006 Indian Super Cup and won 2–1 with goals from Ndem Guy Herve and Alvito D'Cunha.

==== Fixtures & results ====
Win Draw Loss

27 May 2005	Mahindra United	1–2	East Bengal	Mumbai
14:30 IST	Yusif Yakubu 65'	Report	Ndem Guy Herve 23'; Alvito D'Cunha 33'	Stadium: Cooperage Ground; Referee: S Suresh; Man of the Match: Alvito D'Cunha (East Bengal)

== Statistics ==
=== Appearances ===
Players with no appearances are not included in the list.

Appearances for East Bengal in 2005–06 season
No.	Pos.	Nat.	Name	CFL		NFL		Fed Cup		IFA Shield		Durand Cup		Super Cup		Total	
No.	Pos.	Nat.	Name	Apps	Starts	Apps	Starts	Apps	Starts	Apps	Starts	Apps	Starts	Apps	Starts	Apps	Starts
Goalkeepers
1	GK	(India)	Naseem Akhtar	4	4	8	8			2	2	2	2			16	16
21	GK	(India)	Abhra Mondal	4	4	2	2			1	1					7	7
24	GK	(India)	Rajat Ghosh Dastidar	7	6	7	7	2	2					1	1	17	16
Defenders
2	DF	(India)	Muttah Suresh	5	4	6	4	2	2	2	2	2	2	1	1	18	15
5	DF	(India)	Habibur Rehman Mondal	4	4	3	2					2	2			9	8
12	DF	(India)	Arun Malhotra	7	7			1	1	1	1					9	9
12	DF	(India)	Anupam Sarkar			15	15									15	15
16	DF	(India)	Covan Lawrence	11	10	11	11	2	2	3	3	2	2	1	0	30	28
17	DF	(India)	Surya Bikash Chakraborty	4	4	1	1									5	5
22	DF	(India)	Debabrata Roy	5	5	10	3	2	2	1	1			1	1	19	12
26	DF	(Cameroon)	Ngassa Guy Martial			12	12							1	1	13	13
27	DF	(India)	Gurpreet Singh	4	4					3	2					7	6
29	DF	(India)	Saumik Dey	11	11	11	11	1	1	2	2	2	2			27	27
	DF	(India)	Debkumar Sashmal	7	5											7	5
	DF	(India)	Debjit Ghosh	7	6					2	1					9	7
Midfielders
6	MF	(India)	Dipankar Roy	7	7	9	0	2	1	1	1			1	0	20	9
7	MF	(India)	Jayanta Sen	6	3	15	15							1	1	22	19
8	MF	(India)	Sasthi Duley	8	8	10	5			3	3			1	1	22	17
9	MF	(India)	Alvito D'Cunha	7	6	12	7	1	1	2	2			1	1	23	17
11	MF	(India)	Kalia Kulothungan	8	4	10	8			3	1			1	0	22	13
14	MF	(India)	Chandan Das	7	2					2	2	1	1			10	5
18	MF	(India)	Tushar Rakshit	3	0											3	0
19	MF	(India)	Syed Rahim Nabi	12	11	15	14	2	2					1	1	30	28
20	MF	(Cameroon)	Ndem Guy Herve			13	13							1	1	14	14
27	MF	(India)	Amandeep Singh	1	1	1	1									2	2
28	MF	(India)	Shylo Malsawmtluanga	10	7	17	17	1	0	3	1	1	1	1	1	33	27
30	MF	(India)	Bernard Pires	5	5	3	0	1	1	2	2	2	2			13	10
32	MF	(India)	Gouranga Dutta	3	1	11	7							1	1	15	9
	MF	(India)	Jatin Singh Bisht	11	8			2	2			1	1			14	11
	MF	(India)	Sandip Das	5	5											5	5
	MF	(Democratic Republic of the Congo)	Liswa Nduti					2	1	1	0	2	2			5	3
Forwards
10	FW	(Nigeria)	Mike Okoro	2	1	9	6	2	2	3	3	2	2			18	14
12	FW	(India)	I.M. Vijayan	5	3			2	0							7	3
15	FW	(India)	Bhaichung Bhutia			16	16									16	16
25	FW	(India)	R.C. Prakash	8	6	2	2			1	0	2	1			13	9
	FW	(South Africa)	Sydney Nkalanga					2	2	3	3	2	2			7	7

=== Goal scorers ===
Goals for East Bengal in 2005–06 season
Rank	No.	Pos.	Nat.	Name	CFL	NFL	Fed Cup	IFA Shield	Durand Cup	Super Cup	Total
1	15	FW	(India)	Bhaichung Bhutia		12					12
2	19	MF	(India)	Syed Rahim Nabi	8	3	0	0	0	0	11
3	9	MF	(India)	Alvito D'Cunha	2	0	0	2	0	1	5
3	10	FW	(Nigeria)	Mike Okoro	1	1	1	1	1	0	5
5	28	MF	(India)	Shylo Malsawmtluanga	2	1	0	1	0	0	4
6	6	MF	(India)	Dipankar Roy	1	1	1	0	0	0	3
6	12	FW	(India)	I.M. Vijayan	3		0	0	0		3
6	20	MF	(Cameroon)	Ndem Guy Herve		2				1	3
9	11	MF	(India)	Kalia Kulothungan	1	0	0	1	0	0	2
9	14	MF	(India)	Chandan Das	0	0	0	2	0	0	2
9	22	DF	(India)	Debabrata Roy	0	2	0	0	0	0	2
9	25	FW	(India)	R.C. Prakash	1	0	0	0	1	0	2
9	32	MF	(India)	Gouranga Dutta	1	1	0	0	0	0	2
14	7	MF	(India)	Jayanta Sen	0	1	0	0	0	0	1
14	8	MF	(India)	Sasthi Duley	1	0	0	0	0	0	1
14	12	DF	(India)	Arun Malhotra	1		0	0	0	0	1
14	29	DF	(India)	Saumik Dey	1	0	0	0	0	0	1
14	30	MF	(India)	Bernard Pires	1	0	0	0	0	0	1
14		FW	(South Africa)	Sydney Nkalanga			1	0	0		1
14		MF	(India)	Jatin Singh Bisht	0		0	0	1	0	1
Own goals					1	1	0	0	0	0	2
Total					25	25	3	7	3	2	65
