= List of Kolkata Derby matches =

Due to a lack of proper maintenance and restoration of data, after many pieces of research, the overall matches including competitive, walkovers and friendly matches data have been retrieved as far as possible. Though the data is just an approximation, as of 2026, it is believed that the tally of overall meetings stands at 412 matches up till now, where East Bengal have been triumphant 145 and Mohun Bagan 136 times and 131 ended in draw, which also includes walkover wins. Among these two historic clubs, Mohun Bagan has won a total of 197 tournaments, while East Bengal has won 163 tournaments.

== Kolkata Derby matches in major competitions ==
=== Kolkata Derby in ISL ===
Season	Date	Venue	Matches		
Season	Date	Venue	Home	Score	Away
2020–21	27 November 2020	Tilak Maidan Stadium (Note: Due to the COVID-19 pandemic in India, the 2020–21 Indian Super League season was held entirely in Goa, inside closed doors and East Bengal was allotted the Tilak Maidan Stadium as their home ground for the season while Mohun Bagan were allotted the Fatorda Stadium.)	East Bengal	0–2	Mohun Bagan
2020–21	19 February 2021	Fatorda Stadium	Mohun Bagan	3–1	East Bengal
2021–22	27 November 2021	Tilak Maidan Stadium (Note: Due to the COVID-19 pandemic in India, the 2021–22 Indian Super League season would also be held entirely in Goa, behind closed doors. East Bengal is allotted the Tilak Maidan Stadium as their home ground for the season while Mohun Bagan is allotted the Fatorda Stadium.)	East Bengal	0–3	Mohun Bagan
2021–22	29 January 2022	Fatorda Stadium	Mohun Bagan	3–1	East Bengal
2022–23	29 October 2022	Salt Lake Stadium	Mohun Bagan	2–0	East Bengal
2022–23	25 February 2023	Salt Lake Stadium	East Bengal	0–2	Mohun Bagan
2023–24	3 February 2024	Salt Lake Stadium	Mohun Bagan	2–2	East Bengal
2023–24	10 March 2024	Salt Lake Stadium	East Bengal	1–3	Mohun Bagan
2024–25	19 October 2024	Salt Lake Stadium	East Bengal	0–2	Mohun Bagan
2024–25	11 January 2025	Indira Gandhi Athletic Stadium (Note: In 2024–25, the away match against Mohun Bagan was shifted to Guwahati due to administrative issues.)	Mohun Bagan	1–0	East Bengal
2025–26	17 May 2026	Salt Lake Stadium	Mohun Bagan	1–1	East Bengal

==== Overall in ISL ====
Overall ISL head-to-head record
East Bengal wins	Mohun Bagan wins	Draws
0	9	2

=== Kolkata Derby in NFL/I-League ===
Season	Date	Venue	Matches		
Season	Date	Venue	Home	Score	Away
1997–98	6 January 1998	Salt Lake Stadium	Mohun Bagan	2–1	East Bengal
1997–98	4 March 1998	Salt Lake Stadium	East Bengal	0–0	Mohun Bagan
1998–99	2 March 1999	Fatorda Stadium (Note: The Second round of the 1998–99 NFL was held entirely at Goa. East Bengal was given Home team status based on draw.)	East Bengal	1–1	Mohun Bagan
1998–99	10 March 1999	Salt Lake Stadium	Mohun Bagan	0–2	East Bengal
1999–00	3 January 2000	Salt Lake Stadium	Mohun Bagan	1–0	East Bengal
1999–00	22 March 2000	Salt Lake Stadium	East Bengal	3–1	Mohun Bagan
2000–01	17 February 2001	Salt Lake Stadium	East Bengal	1–0	Mohun Bagan
2000–01	10 April 2001	Salt Lake Stadium	Mohun Bagan	0–0	East Bengal
2001–02	16 December 2001	Salt Lake Stadium	East Bengal	0–1	Mohun Bagan
2001–02	11 March 2002	Salt Lake Stadium	Mohun Bagan	1–0	East Bengal
2002–03	8 December 2002	Salt Lake Stadium	Mohun Bagan	0–2	East Bengal
2002–03	25 February 2003	Salt Lake Stadium	East Bengal	2–1	Mohun Bagan
2003–04	22 January 2004	Salt Lake Stadium	East Bengal	2–1	Mohun Bagan
2003–04	25 April 2004	Salt Lake Stadium	Mohun Bagan	1–2	East Bengal
2004–05	12 January 2005	Salt Lake Stadium	East Bengal	0–0	Mohun Bagan
2004–05	24 April 2005	Salt Lake Stadium	Mohun Bagan	0–1	East Bengal
2005–06	22 January 2006	Salt Lake Stadium	Mohun Bagan	0–0	East Bengal
2005–06	8 April 2006	Salt Lake Stadium	East Bengal	3–1	Mohun Bagan
2006–07	27 February 2007	Salt Lake Stadium	East Bengal	1–0	Mohun Bagan
2006–07	15 April 2007	Salt Lake Stadium	Mohun Bagan	2–1	East Bengal
2007–08	20 December 2007	Salt Lake Stadium	Mohun Bagan	1–0	East Bengal
2007–08	21 January 2008	Salt Lake Stadium	East Bengal	0–2	Mohun Bagan
2008–09	25 October 2008	Salt Lake Stadium	Mohun Bagan	1–1	East Bengal
2008–09	22 February 2009	Salt Lake Stadium	East Bengal	3–0	Mohun Bagan
2009–10	25 October 2009	Salt Lake Stadium	East Bengal	3–5	Mohun Bagan
2009–10	16 May 2010	Salt Lake Stadium	Mohun Bagan	2–1	East Bengal
2010–11	6 February 2011	Salt Lake Stadium	Mohun Bagan	1–1	East Bengal
2010–11	9 April 2011	Salt Lake Stadium	East Bengal	2–1	Mohun Bagan
2011–12	20 November 2011	Salt Lake Stadium	Mohun Bagan	1–0	East Bengal
2011–12	4 February 2012	Salt Lake Stadium	East Bengal	1–1	Mohun Bagan
2012–13	9 December 2012	Salt Lake Stadium	East Bengal	3–0 (Note: Mohun Bagan forfeited the match at HT when East Bengal was leading 1–0 with a goal from Harmanjot Khabra. East Bengal was awarded a 3–0 win)	Mohun Bagan
2012–13	9 February 2013	Salt Lake Stadium	Mohun Bagan	0–0	East Bengal
2013–14	24 November 2013	Salt Lake Stadium	East Bengal	1–0	Mohun Bagan
2013–14	1 March 2014	Salt Lake Stadium	Mohun Bagan	1–1	East Bengal
2014–15	17 February 2015	Salt Lake Stadium	East Bengal	1–1	Mohun Bagan
2014–15	28 March 2015	Salt Lake Stadium	Mohun Bagan	1–0	East Bengal
2015–16	23 January 2016	Salt Lake Stadium	Mohun Bagan	1–1	East Bengal
2015–16	2 April 2016	Kanchenjunga Stadium	East Bengal	2–1	Mohun Bagan
2016–17	12 February 2017	Kanchenjunga Stadium	East Bengal	0–0	Mohun Bagan
2016–17	9 April 2017	Kanchenjunga Stadium	Mohun Bagan	2–1	East Bengal
2017–18	3 December 2017	Salt Lake Stadium	Mohun Bagan	1–0	East Bengal
2017–18	21 January 2018	Salt Lake Stadium	East Bengal	0–2	Mohun Bagan
2018–19	16 December 2018	Salt Lake Stadium	East Bengal	3–2	Mohun Bagan
2018–19	27 January 2019	Salt Lake Stadium	Mohun Bagan	0–2	East Bengal
2019–20	19 January 2020	Salt Lake Stadium	Mohun Bagan	2–1	East Bengal
2019–20	15 March 2020	Salt Lake Stadium	East Bengal	– (Note: Match was cancelled due to COVID-19 pandemic)	Mohun Bagan

==== Overall in NFL / I-League ====
Overall NFL / I-League head-to-head record
East Bengal wins	Mohun Bagan wins	Draws
17	15	13

=== Kolkata Derby in Federation Cup/Super Cup ===
List of all Kolkata Derby played in Federation Cup and its rebranded version, Super Cup.

Season	Date	Round	Venue	Matches		
Season	Date	Round	Venue	Team1	Score	Team2
1978	7 May 1978	Final	Coimbatore	Mohun Bagan	0–0	East Bengal
1978	9 May 1978	Final (replay)	Coimbatore	Mohun Bagan	0–0	East Bengal
1980	8 May 1980	Final	Kolkata	Mohun Bagan	1–1	East Bengal
1981	5 May 1981	Semi final	Madras	Mohun Bagan	2–0	East Bengal
1981	8 May 1981	Semi final	Madras	East Bengal	0–0	Mohun Bagan
1984	15 May 1984	Semi final	Tiruchirappalli	Mohun Bagan	0–0	East Bengal
1984	17 May 1984	Semi final	Tiruchirappalli	East Bengal	1–0	Mohun Bagan
1985	19 May 1985	Final	Bangalore	Mohun Bagan	0–1	East Bengal
1986	25 September 1986	Final	Srinagar	Mohun Bagan	0–0, 5–4 pen	East Bengal
1990	1 March 1990	East Zone Round Robin	Cuttack	East Bengal	1–0	Mohun Bagan
1991	29 December 1990	Quarterfinal group	Kannur	East Bengal	1–1	Mohun Bagan
1992	17 February 1992	Final	Kolkata	Mohun Bagan	2–0	East Bengal
1993	18 April 1993	Quarterfinal group	Kozhikode	East Bengal	0–0	Mohun Bagan
1995	1 June 1995	Semi final	Kolkata	East Bengal	2–1	Mohun Bagan
1996 – Jan Edition	15 January 1996	Quarterfinal group	Kannur	East Bengal	1–1	Mohun Bagan
1997	13 July 1997	Semi final	Kolkata	East Bengal	4–1	Mohun Bagan
1998	12 September 1998	Final	Kolkata	East Bengal	1–2	Mohun Bagan
2007	11 September 2007	Semi final	Ludhiana	East Bengal	3–2	Mohun Bagan
2008	18 December 2008	Semi final	Kolkata	Mohun Bagan	1–1, 5–3 pen	East Bengal
2009	31 December 2009	Semi final	Guwahati	East Bengal	2–0	Mohun Bagan
2010	2 October 2010	Final	Cuttack	East Bengal	1–0	Mohun Bagan
2016	14 May 2017	Semi final	Cuttack	Mohun Bagan	2–0	East Bengal
2024	19 January 2024	Group stage	Bhubaneshwar	Mohun Bagan	1–3	East Bengal
2025	31 October 2025	Group stage	Margao	Mohun Bagan	0–0	East Bengal

==== Overall in Federation Cup/Super Cup ====
Overall Fed Cup/Super Cup head-to-head record
East Bengal wins	Mohun Bagan wins	Draws
9	6	9

=== Kolkata Derby in IFA Shield ===
List of all Kolkata Derby played in IFA Shield

Season	Date	Round	Ground	Matches		
Season	Date	Round	Ground	Team1	Score	Team2
1944	5 August 1944	Semifinal	Calcutta Ground	Mohun Bagan	0–1	East Bengal
1945	9 August 1945	Final	Calcutta Ground	Mohun Bagan	0–1	East Bengal
1947	15 November 1947	Final	Calcutta Ground	Mohun Bagan	1–0	East Bengal
1949	15 September 1949	Final	Calcutta Ground	East Bengal	2–1	Mohun Bagan
1951	11 September 1951	Final	EB-MB Ground	East Bengal	0–0	Mohun Bagan
1951	18 September 1951	Final (replay)	EB-MB Ground	East Bengal	2–0	Mohun Bagan
1958	26 September 1958	Final	EB-MB Ground	East Bengal	0–0	Mohun Bagan
1958	28 January 1959	Final (replay)	Calcutta Ground	East Bengal	1–0	Mohun Bagan
1961	26 September 1961	Final	EB-MB Ground	Mohun Bagan	0–0	East Bengal
1961	27 September 1961	Final (replay)	EB-MB Ground	Mohun Bagan	0–0	East Bengal
1964	22 September 1964	Final	East Bengal Ground	Mohun Bagan	1–1	East Bengal
1965	22 September 1965	Final	Mohun Bagan Ground	Mohun Bagan	0–0	East Bengal
1965	16 October 1965	Final (Replay)	Mohun Bagan Ground	Mohun Bagan	0–1	East Bengal
1967	30 September 1967	Final	Eden Gardens	Mohun Bagan	0–0	East Bengal
1969	20 September 1969	Final	East Bengal Ground	Mohun Bagan	3–1	East Bengal
1972	16 September 1972	Final	Eden Gardens	Mohun Bagan	0–0	East Bengal
1972	30 October 1972	Final (replay)	Eden Gardens	Mohun Bagan	W/O	East Bengal
1973	25 September 1973	Semifinal	East Bengal Ground	Mohun Bagan	0–3	East Bengal
1974	29 September 1974	Final	East Bengal Ground	East Bengal	1–0	Mohun Bagan
1975	30 September 1975	Final	Mohun Bagan Ground	Mohun Bagan	0–5	East Bengal
1976	25 September 1976	Final	Mohun Bagan Ground	East Bengal	0–0	Mohun Bagan
1977	28 September 1977	Final	Eden Gardens	East Bengal	0–1	Mohun Bagan
1979	16 September 1979	Final	Mohun Bagan Ground	Mohun Bagan	1–0	East Bengal
1981	26 September 1981	Final	East Bengal Ground	Mohun Bagan	2–2	East Bengal
1984	28 September 1984	Final	Salt Lake Stadium	Mohun Bagan	0–1	East Bengal
1985	6 December 1985	Group league	Salt Lake Stadium	Mohun Bagan	0–2	East Bengal
1986	12 December 1986	Round robin league	Salt Lake Stadium	East Bengal	0–0	Mohun Bagan
1986	20 December 1986	Final	Salt Lake Stadium	East Bengal	0–0, 4–2 pen	Mohun Bagan
1987	11 December 1987	Quarterfinal	Salt Lake Stadium	East Bengal	2–0	Mohun Bagan
1990	15 September 1990	Quarterfinal group	Salt Lake Stadium	East Bengal	0–0	Mohun Bagan
1993	6 December 1993	Quarterfinal	Mohun Bagan Ground	East Bengal	1–0	Mohun Bagan
1994	9 December 1994	Quarterfinal group	Salt Lake Stadium	East Bengal	1–1	Mohun Bagan
1994	21 December 1994	Final	Salt Lake Stadium	East Bengal	2–1	Mohun Bagan
1995	6 February 1996	Semifinal	Salt Lake Stadium	East Bengal	1–0	Mohun Bagan
1998	23 November 1998	Final	Salt Lake Stadium	Mohun Bagan	2–1	East Bengal
2000	16 September 2000	Final	Salt Lake Stadium	Mohun Bagan	1–1, 1–4 pen	East Bengal
2001	6 October 2001	Semifinal	Salt Lake Stadium	East Bengal	1–0	Mohun Bagan
2003	28 September 2003	Final	Salt Lake Stadium	East Bengal	0–0, 3–5 pen	Mohun Bagan
2004	8 October 2004	Semifinal	Salt Lake Stadium	East Bengal	1–1, 6–7 pen	Mohun Bagan
2005	27 November 2005	Group stage	Salt Lake Stadium	East Bengal	4–1	Mohun Bagan
2013	13 March 2013	Semifinal	Salt Lake Stadium	East Bengal	1–1, 4–2 pen	Mohun Bagan
2025	18 October 2025	Final	Salt Lake Stadium	East Bengal	1–1, 4–5 pen	Mohun Bagan
2026	8 October 2026	Final	Salt Lake Stadium	East Bengal	0–1	Mohun Bagan

Note: Between 2015–2019, the IFA Shield was a U-19 Tournament. Clashes during this period is not taken into account for senior level Kolkata Derby matches.

==== Overall in IFA Shield ====
Overall IFA Shield head-to-head record
East Bengal wins	Mohun Bagan wins	Draws
21	9	13

=== Kolkata Derby in Durand Cup ===
List of all Kolkata Derby played in Durand Cup

Season	Date	Round	Matches		
Season	Date	Round	Team1	Score	Team2
1957	28 December 1957	Semi Final	Mohun Bagan	0–0	East Bengal
1957	30 December 1957	Semi Final (replay)	Mohun Bagan	2–3	East Bengal
1960	18 January 1961	Final	Mohun Bagan	1–1	East Bengal
1960	19 January 1961	Final (replay)	Mohun Bagan	0–0	East Bengal
1964	10 December 1964	Final	Mohun Bagan	2–0	East Bengal
1970	4 February 1971	Final	East Bengal	2–0	Mohun Bagan
1972	11 January 1973	Final	East Bengal	0–0	Mohun Bagan
1972	12 January 1973	Final (replay)	East Bengal	1–0	Mohun Bagan
1974	5 January 1975	Semi Final	East Bengal	0–1	Mohun Bagan
1978	17 January 1979	Final	East Bengal	3–0	Mohun Bagan
1982	10 February 1983	Final	East Bengal	0–0	Mohun Bagan
1984	19 November 1984	Final	Mohun Bagan	1–0	East Bengal
1986	9 November 1986	Final	Mohun Bagan	1–0	East Bengal
1987	2 January 1988	Semi Final	Mohun Bagan	3–0	East Bengal
1988	24 December 1988	Semi Final	East Bengal	2–0	Mohun Bagan
1989	30 December 1989	Final	East Bengal	0–0, 3–1 pen	Mohun Bagan
1994	8 November 1994	Final	East Bengal	0–1	Mohun Bagan
1998	29 October 1998	Semi Final	East Bengal	2–0	Mohun Bagan
2004	10 November 2004	Final	East Bengal	2–1	Mohun Bagan
2022	28 August 2022	Group stage	East Bengal	0–1	Mohun Bagan
2023	12 August 2023	Group stage	Mohun Bagan	0–1	East Bengal
2023	3 September 2023	Final	East Bengal	0–1	Mohun Bagan
2024	18 August 2024	Group stage	Mohun Bagan	abandoned	East Bengal
2025	17 August 2025	Quarter Final	Mohun Bagan	1–2	East Bengal
2026	25 July 2026	Group stage	East Bengal	0–1	Mohun Bagan
2026	23 August 2026	Final	East Bengal	4–1	Mohun Bagan

==== Overall in Durand Cup ====
Overall Durand Cup head-to-head record
East Bengal wins	Mohun Bagan wins	Draws
11	9	5

=== Kolkata Derby in Rovers Cup ===
List of all Kolkata Derby played in Rovers Cup

Year	Round	Matches		
Year	Round	Team1	Score	Team2
1960	Semifinal	East Bengal	2–1	Mohun Bagan
1967	Final	East Bengal	0–0	Mohun Bagan
1967	Final	East Bengal	2–0	Mohun Bagan
1969	Final	East Bengal	3–0	Mohun Bagan
1972	Final	East Bengal	0–0	Mohun Bagan
1972	Final (replay)	East Bengal	0–0	Mohun Bagan
1977	Semifinal	East Bengal	0–2	Mohun Bagan
1980	Semifinal	East Bengal	2–2	Mohun Bagan
1980	Semifinal	Mohun Bagan	1–2	East Bengal
1987	Semifinal	Mohun Bagan	1–0	East Bengal
1988	Semifinal	Mohun Bagan	1–0	East Bengal
2000	Semifinal	Mohun Bagan	1–0	East Bengal

==== Overall in Rovers Cup ====
Overall Rovers Cup head-to-head record
East Bengal wins	Mohun Bagan wins	Draws
4	4	4

=== Kolkata Derby in Calcutta Football League ===
List of all Kolkata Derby played in Calcutta Football League

As of 27 July 2025

Year	Matches					
Year	1st leg			2nd leg		
Year	Team1	Score	Team2	Team1	Score	Team2
1925	East Bengal	1–0	Mohun Bagan	Mohun Bagan	1–0	East Bengal
1926	East Bengal	2–1	Mohun Bagan	Mohun Bagan	0–0	East Bengal
1927	East Bengal	0–0	Mohun Bagan	Mohun Bagan	0–0	East Bengal
1928	East Bengal	0–2	Mohun Bagan	Mohun Bagan	1–1	East Bengal
1932	East Bengal	1–0	Mohun Bagan	Mohun Bagan	2–3	East Bengal
1933	East Bengal	2–2	Mohun Bagan	Mohun Bagan	1–1	East Bengal
1934	East Bengal	0–2	Mohun Bagan	Mohun Bagan	1–1	East Bengal
1935	East Bengal	0–0	Mohun Bagan	Mohun Bagan	1–1	East Bengal
1936	East Bengal	4–0	Mohun Bagan	Mohun Bagan	0–0	East Bengal
1937	East Bengal	1–1	Mohun Bagan	Mohun Bagan	1–0	East Bengal
1938	East Bengal	1–1	Mohun Bagan	Mohun Bagan	1–1	East Bengal
1939	East Bengal	1–2	Mohun Bagan	Mohun Bagan	W/O	East Bengal
1940	East Bengal	1–0	Mohun Bagan	Mohun Bagan	0–0	East Bengal
1941	East Bengal	2–0	Mohun Bagan	Mohun Bagan	0–2	East Bengal
1942	East Bengal	2–1	Mohun Bagan	Mohun Bagan	0–1	East Bengal
1943	East Bengal	1–0	Mohun Bagan	Mohun Bagan	2-0	East Bengal
1944	East Bengal	0–1	Mohun Bagan	Mohun Bagan	2–0	East Bengal
1945	East Bengal	2–0	Mohun Bagan	Mohun Bagan	0–0	East Bengal
1946	East Bengal	1–1	Mohun Bagan	Mohun Bagan	0–0	East Bengal
1948	East Bengal	1–1	Mohun Bagan	Mohun Bagan	3–0	East Bengal
1949	East Bengal	0–1	Mohun Bagan	Mohun Bagan	2–1	East Bengal
1950	East Bengal	1–0	Mohun Bagan	Mohun Bagan	2–2	East Bengal
1951	East Bengal	0–3	Mohun Bagan	Mohun Bagan	0–2	East Bengal
1952	East Bengal	1–0	Mohun Bagan	Mohun Bagan	0–1	East Bengal
1953	East Bengal	1–0	Mohun Bagan	Did not take place		
1954	East Bengal	1–3	Mohun Bagan	Mohun Bagan	W/O	East Bengal
1955	East Bengal	1–1	Mohun Bagan	Mohun Bagan	2–0	East Bengal
1956	East Bengal	0–2	Mohun Bagan	Mohun Bagan	0–0	East Bengal
1957	East Bengal	1–0	Mohun Bagan	Mohun Bagan	0–1	East Bengal
1958	East Bengal	0–1	Mohun Bagan	Mohun Bagan	2–1	East Bengal
1959	East Bengal	0–2	Mohun Bagan	Mohun Bagan	0–1	East Bengal
1960	East Bengal	0–0	Mohun Bagan	Mohun Bagan	2–0	East Bengal
1961	East Bengal	1–0	Mohun Bagan	Mohun Bagan	0–1	East Bengal
1962	East Bengal	1–0	Mohun Bagan	Mohun Bagan	0–0	East Bengal
1962	Championship Play-off					
1962	Mohun Bagan		2-0		East Bengal	
1963	East Bengal	0–3	Mohun Bagan	Mohun Bagan	0–2	East Bengal
1964	East Bengal	0–0	Mohun Bagan	Mohun Bagan	3–1	East Bengal
1965	East Bengal	0–0	Mohun Bagan	Mohun Bagan	0–0	East Bengal
1966	East Bengal	1–1	Mohun Bagan	Mohun Bagan	0–1	East Bengal
1967	East Bengal	2–1	Mohun Bagan	Mohun Bagan	1–0	East Bengal
	First Stage			Super League		
1968	East Bengal	W/O	Mohun Bagan	Mohun Bagan	1–0	East Bengal
	1st leg			2nd leg		
1969	East Bengal	1–0	Mohun Bagan	Mohun Bagan	0–0	East Bengal
1970	East Bengal	1–0	Mohun Bagan	Mohun Bagan	0–1	East Bengal
	Single leg					
	Team1		Score		Team2	
1971	East Bengal		1–1		Mohun Bagan	
1972	East Bengal		2–0		Mohun Bagan	
	1st leg			2nd leg		
	Team1	Score	Team2	Team1	Score	Team2
1973	East Bengal	2–1	Mohun Bagan	Mohun Bagan	0–1	East Bengal
	Single leg					
	Team1		Score		Team2	
1974	East Bengal		W/O		Mohun Bagan	
1975	East Bengal		1–0		Mohun Bagan	
1976	East Bengal		0–1		Mohun Bagan	
1977	Mohun Bagan		0-2		East Bengal	
1978	East Bengal		0–1		Mohun Bagan	
1979	Mohun Bagan		1–1		East Bengal	
1980	Mohun Bagan		0–0		East Bengal	
1981	Mohun Bagan		1–0		East Bengal	
1982	Mohun Bagan		0–1		East Bengal	
1983	East Bengal		0–0		Mohun Bagan	
1984	East Bengal		0–1		Mohun Bagan	
	1st leg			2nd leg		
	Team1	Score	Team2	Team1	Score	Team2
1985	East Bengal	1–1	Mohun Bagan	Mohun Bagan	W/O	East Bengal
1986	East Bengal	1–1	Mohun Bagan	Mohun Bagan	0–0	East Bengal
1987	East Bengal	0–0	Mohun Bagan	Mohun Bagan	0–2	East Bengal
1988	East Bengal	2–1	Mohun Bagan	Mohun Bagan	0–0	East Bengal
1989	East Bengal	0–2	Mohun Bagan	Mohun Bagan	1–1	East Bengal
1990	East Bengal	0–2	Mohun Bagan	Mohun Bagan	1–2	East Bengal
1991	East Bengal	0–0	Mohun Bagan	Mohun Bagan	0–0	East Bengal
1992	East Bengal	1–1	Mohun Bagan	Mohun Bagan	0–0	East Bengal
1993	East Bengal	1–1	Mohun Bagan	Mohun Bagan	0–1	East Bengal
1994	East Bengal	1–1	Mohun Bagan	Mohun Bagan	0–0	East Bengal
1995	East Bengal	2–0	Mohun Bagan	Mohun Bagan	3–1	East Bengal
1996	East Bengal	1–1	Mohun Bagan	Mohun Bagan	0–0	East Bengal
1997	East Bengal	0–1	Mohun Bagan	Mohun Bagan	0–0	East Bengal
1998	East Bengal	1–2	Mohun Bagan	Mohun Bagan	1–2	East Bengal
1998	Championship Play-off					
1998	East Bengal		1–0		Mohun Bagan	
1999	East Bengal	2–0	Mohun Bagan	Mohun Bagan	1–1	East Bengal
2000	East Bengal	1–1	Mohun Bagan	Mohun Bagan	1–1	East Bengal
2001	East Bengal	0–1	Mohun Bagan	Mohun Bagan	1–1	East Bengal
2002	East Bengal	2–1	Mohun Bagan	Mohun Bagan	1–0	East Bengal
2003	Mohun Bagan	0–0	East Bengal	East Bengal	3–0	Mohun Bagan
2003	Championship Play-off					
2003	East Bengal		1–1, 5–4 pen		Mohun Bagan	
2004	East Bengal	1–1	Mohun Bagan	Mohun Bagan	0–0	East Bengal
2005	East Bengal	0–1	Mohun Bagan	Mohun Bagan	1–0	East Bengal
2006	East Bengal	0–1	Mohun Bagan	Mohun Bagan	1–0	East Bengal
2007	East Bengal	3–4	Mohun Bagan	Mohun Bagan	2–0	East Bengal
2008	East Bengal	1–2	Mohun Bagan	Mohun Bagan	1–1	East Bengal
	Single leg					
	Team1		Score		Team2	
2009	Mohun Bagan		0–0		East Bengal	
2010	Mohun Bagan		0–2		East Bengal	
2011	East Bengal		0–2		Mohun Bagan	
2012	East Bengal		3–2		Mohun Bagan	
2013	East Bengal		0–1		Mohun Bagan	
2014	East Bengal		3–1		Mohun Bagan	
2015	East Bengal		4–0		Mohun Bagan	
2016	East Bengal		W/O		Mohun Bagan	
2017	East Bengal		2–2		Mohun Bagan	
2018	East Bengal		2–2		Mohun Bagan	
2019	Mohun Bagan		0–0		East Bengal	
2023	East Bengal		W/O		Mohun Bagan	
2024	Mohun Bagan		1–2		East Bengal	
2025	East Bengal		3–2		Mohun Bagan	
2026	East Bengal		1–1		Mohun Bagan	

==== Overall in Calcutta Football League ====
Overall CFL head-to-head record^{[a]}
East Bengal wins	Mohun Bagan wins	Draws
53	44	61

^{[a]} Includes 7 W/O - Walkover matches

=== Kolkata Derby in other domestic competitions ===
Year	Competition	Round	Matches		
Year	Competition	Round	Team1	Score	Team2
1921	Cooch Behar Cup	Semifinal	East Bengal	0–0	Mohun Bagan
1921	Cooch Behar Cup	Semifinal (replay)	East Bengal	0–3	Mohun Bagan
1921	Khogendra Shield	Semifinal	East Bengal	2–1	Mohun Bagan
1922	Cooch Behar Cup	Final	Mohun Bagan	2–0	East Bengal
1924	Cooch Behar Cup	Semifinal	Mohun Bagan	0–1	East Bengal
1932	Gladstone Cup	Semifinal	Mohun Bagan	1–0	East Bengal
1932	Lady Hardinge Shield	Second round	Mohun Bagan	2–0	East Bengal
1933	Darbhanga Cup	Zonal group	Mohun Bagan	1–0	East Bengal
1934	Darbhanga Cup	Zonal group	Mohun Bagan	4–1	East Bengal
1935	Lady Hardinge Shield	Semifinal	Mohun Bagan	2–1	East Bengal
1935	Darbhanga Cup	Zonal group	Mohun Bagan	1–0	East Bengal
1936	Lady Hardinge Shield	Final	Mohun Bagan	2–0	East Bengal
1936	William Younger Challenge Cup	Final	Mohun Bagan	2–0	East Bengal
1937	Raja Memorial Shield	Final	Mohun Bagan	4–0	East Bengal
1937	Trades Cup	First round	Mohun Bagan	0–0	East Bengal
1937	Trades Cup	First round (replay)	Mohun Bagan	1–0	East Bengal
1937	William Younger Challenge Cup	Third round	Mohun Bagan	2–2	East Bengal
1937	William Younger Challenge Cup	Third round (replay)	Mohun Bagan	3–0	East Bengal
1942	Lady Hardinge Shield	Final	Mohun Bagan	3–1	East Bengal
1944	Cooch Behar Cup	Final	Mohun Bagan	4–2	East Bengal
1947	Cooch Behar Cup	Final	Mohun Bagan	4–1	East Bengal
1957	Horendra Mohan Mukherjee Memorial Shield	Final	East Bengal	2–0	Mohun Bagan
1961	Horendra Mohan Mukherjee Memorial Shield	Final	East Bengal	1–1	Mohun Bagan
1968	Amrita Bazar Cenetary Cup	Final	East Bengal	0–2	Mohun Bagan
1969	Lady Hardinge Shield	Semi Final	East Bengal	3–1	Mohun Bagan
1976	Darjeeling Gold Cup	Final	East Bengal	0–0	Mohun Bagan
1981	Darjeeling Gold Cup	Final	East Bengal	3–2	Mohun Bagan
1982	Darjeeling Gold Cup	Final	East Bengal	0–1	Mohun Bagan
1983	Peerless Trophy	Semifinal	East Bengal	0–2	Mohun Bagan
1987	All Airlines Gold Cup	Group league	East Bengal	1–0	Mohun Bagan
1988	All Airlines Gold Cup	Group league	East Bengal	1–1	Mohun Bagan
1988	J.C. Guha Trophy	Round robin league	East Bengal	0–0	Mohun Bagan
1989	SSS Trophy	Group league	East Bengal	0–0	Mohun Bagan
1990	All Airlines Gold Cup	Group league	East Bengal	2–0	Mohun Bagan
1990	Jawaharlal Nehru Cenetary Cup	First Stage	East Bengal	1–0	Mohun Bagan
1990	Mohun Bagan Cenetary Cup	Group league	East Bengal	1–1	Mohun Bagan
1992	DCM Trophy	Group league	East Bengal	2–1	Mohun Bagan
1992	All Airlines Gold Cup	Group league	East Bengal	1–1	Mohun Bagan
1992	All Airlines Gold Cup	Final	East Bengal	1–0	Mohun Bagan
1993	All Airlines Gold Cup	Group league	East Bengal	2–1	Mohun Bagan
1993	All Airlines Gold Cup	Final	East Bengal	0–0, 6–7 pen	Mohun Bagan
1993	Scissor's Cup	Final	Mohun Bagan	2–1	East Bengal
1993	Kalinga Cup	Final	Mohun Bagan	0–2	East Bengal
1993	Shibdas Bhaduri Memorial Trophy	Quarterfinal	Mohun Bagan	2–1	East Bengal
1994	All Airlines Gold Cup	Semifinal	East Bengal	1–0	Mohun Bagan
1994	Scissor's Cup	Semifinal	Mohun Bagan	3–2	East Bengal
1995	All Airlines Gold Cup	Final	East Bengal	2–0	Mohun Bagan
1995	PNB Cenetary Cup	Final	East Bengal	0–0, 3–4 pen	Mohun Bagan
1996	Bordoloi Trophy	Final	East Bengal	1–1	Mohun Bagan
1996	McDowell Cup	Final	East Bengal	0–1	Mohun Bagan
1999	All Airlines Gold Cup	Semifinal	East Bengal	3–1	Mohun Bagan
2000	McDowell Cup	Final	East Bengal	1–0	Mohun Bagan
2010	Mohammedan Platinum Celebration Cup	Final	East Bengal	3–3, 3–2 pen	Mohun Bagan

=== Kolkata Derby exhibition matches ===
As of 2 September 2024

Date	Occasion	Venue	Matches			Scorers	
Date	Occasion	Venue	Team1	Score	Team2	Team 1	Team 2
20 May 1929	Exhibition match	Bhowanipore Ground	Mohun Bagan	1–0	East Bengal	Mona Dutta	
23 August 1941	Charity Match	Serampore Ground	Mohun Bagan	0–2	East Bengal		Sunil Ghosh (2)
30 August 1941	Charity Match	EBRM Ground Sealdah	Mohun Bagan	1–2	East Bengal	na	na
31 August 1941	War Relief Fund	Hazaribagh Ground	Mohun Bagan	1–0	East Bengal	A Ray Choudhury	
2 August 1942	Charity Match	Chandernagar	East Bengal	2–0	Mohun Bagan	A. Banerjee, R. Dey	
18 September 1943	Bengal Relief Fund	Calcutta Ground	Mohun Bagan	0–0	East Bengal		
26 September 1943	Bengal Relief Fund	Dhaka Football Ground	Mohun Bagan	0–0	East Bengal		
10 September 1944	Red Cross Fund	Purulia Ground	Mohun Bagan	0–0	East Bengal		
26 August 1945	Exhibition match	Howrah Div Sports Ground	Mohun Bagan	4–1	East Bengal	Nimu Bose (2), Bhowmick, S. Deb Roy	Mahabir
12 August 1956	Exhibition match for Flood Relief	Kulti CFC Ground	Mohun Bagan	1–1	East Bengal	Mariappa Kempaiah (o.g.)	T. Bose
8 December 1962	War Relief Fund	Sera Stadium, Kharagpur	East Bengal	3–0	Mohun Bagan	Arun Ghosh, S Banerjee, Sunil Nandi	
9 December 1962	War Relief Fund	Barabati Stadium, Cuttack	East Bengal	0–1	Mohun Bagan		L. Bose
19 September 1971	Bimala Prasad Chaliha Memorial Match	Nehru Stadium, Guwahati	East Bengal	0–0	Mohun Bagan		
26 March 1986	Benefit match for Swamy Nayaar (FWA organised)	Salt Lake Stadium	East Bengal	0–2	Mohun Bagan		Bidesh Bose, Manas Bhattacharya
25 May 1986	Aid for Africa	Salt Lake Stadium	East Bengal	0–0	Mohun Bagan		
14 November 1987	Inauguration of Floodlight	Salt Lake Stadium	East Bengal	0–1	Mohun Bagan		Uttam Mukherjee
12 January 1988	Inauguration of Stadium	Kanchenjunga Stadium	East Bengal	0–0	Mohun Bagan		
1 May 1991	Aid for Indian Army Widows	Salt Lake Stadium	Mohun Bagan	0–0	East Bengal		
28 June 1992 (Note: Indian cricket legend Kapil Dev featured for East Bengal FC in this match.)	Charity match for Bangalore	Salt Lake Stadium	Mohun Bagan	abandoned (Note: Owing to rain, the match had to be abandoned midway into the second-half)	East Bengal		
28 May 1994	Benefit match for Sailen Manna	Durgapur Nehru Stadium	East Bengal	1–3	Mohun Bagan	Krishanu Dey	Tausif Jamal, Goutam Ghosh, Sudip Chakraborty
23 September 1995	Benefit match for Swamy Nayaar	Salt Lake Stadium	East Bengal	3–0	Mohun Bagan	Nima Bhutia (2), Biswanath Mondal	
7 October 1995	Exhibition match	DSA Ground, Silchar	East Bengal	0–0	Mohun Bagan		
8 October 1995	Exhibition match	Karimganj Stadium	East Bengal	1–0	Mohun Bagan	Jalaluddin	
12 December 1996	25th Anniversary of Bangladesh war	Salt Lake Stadium	Mohun Bagan	2–0	East Bengal	Dipendu Biswas, Sisir Ghosh	
14 December 1996	Exhibition match	Tinsukia Stadium	Mohun Bagan	1–0	East Bengal	Dipendu Biswas	
20 July 1999	Exhibition match: Sanghati Cup (Kargil Cup)	Kanchenjunga Stadium	Mohun Bagan	0–0, 5-4 pen	East Bengal		
2 September 2024	Exhibition match: Chief Minister's Cup	K. D. Singh Babu Stadium	Mohun Bagan	1–1, 3-2 pen	East Bengal	Suhail Bhat	Muhammed K. Ashique

==== Overall in exhibition matches ====
Overall record in exhibition derby matches
East Bengal wins	Mohun Bagan wins	Draws
6	11	9

== Overall record of Kolkata Derby ==
=== Overall Kolkata Derby Head to Head Record ===
As of matches played on 8 October 2026

Overall Kolkata Derby head-to-head record
Competition	Matches played	East Bengal wins	Mohun Bagan wins	Draws
National Football League / I-League / Indian Super League (Note: Consists of both league winners shield and champions trophy.)	56	17	24	15
Federation Cup / Super Cup	24	9	6	9
Calcutta Football League (Note: Includes 8 Walkover Matches.)	166	58	47	61
IFA Shield (Note: Includes 1 Walkover Match.)	43	21	9	13
Durand Cup	25	11	9	5
Rovers Cup	12	4	4	4
All Airlines Gold Cup	10	7	1	2
Delhi Cloth Mills Trophy	1	1	0	0
Scissors Cup	2	0	2	0
McDowell Cup	2	1	1	0
Bordoloi Trophy	1	0	1	0
Darjeeling Gold Cup	3	1	0	2
Horendra Mukherjee Memorial Shield	2	1	0	1
Amrita Bazar Centenary Cup	1	0	1	0
Peerless Trophy	1	0	1	0
Mohun Bagan Centenary Cup	1	0	0	1
Nehru Centenary Cup	1	1	0	0
J. C. Guha Trophy	1	0	0	1
Shibdas Bhaduri Memorial Trophy	1	0	1	0
SSS Trophy	1	0	0	1
PNB Centenary Trophy	1	0	1	0
Kalinga Cup	1	1	0	0
Md. Sporting Platinum Jubilee Cup	1	1	0	0
Cooch Behar Cup	10	2	4	4
Khogendra Shield	1	1	0	0
Raja Memorial Shield	1	0	1	0
Gladstone Cup	1	0	1	0
Darbhanga Shield	3	0	3	0
William Younger Challenge Cup	3	0	2	1
Lady Hardinge Shield	5	1	4	0
Trades Cup	2	0	1	1
Chandicharan Shield	2	1	1	0
Competitive Matches Total (including walkovers)	385	139	125	121
Exhibition Games	27	6	11	10
All Time Total	412	145	136	131

East Bengal has 6 W/O wins over Mohun Bagan and Mohun Bagan has 3 W/O wins over East Bengal.

== Matches since 2000 ==
- List of all derby matches played since 2000

=== 2000–01 ===
McDowell Cup
10 July 2000
Final

East Bengal	1–0	Mohun Bagan
Anit Ghosh

Salt Lake Stadium, Kolkata
Calcutta Football League
29 July 2000
1st leg

Mohun Bagan	1–1	East Bengal
José Ramirez Barreto		Carlton Chapman

Salt Lake Stadium, Kolkata
Calcutta Football League
2 September 2000
2nd leg

East Bengal	1–1	Mohun Bagan
Surkumar Singh		José Ramirez Barreto

Salt Lake Stadium, Kolkata
IFA Shield
16 September 2000
Final

East Bengal	1–1 (a.e.t.)	Mohun Bagan
Chandan Das 26'		José Ramirez Barreto 78'
Penalties
Chandan Das (penalty scored); Suley Musah (penalty scored); Ratan Singh (penalty scored); Dipendu Biswas (penalty scored)	4–1	(penalty missed) Sammy Omollo; (penalty missed) Dulal Biswas; (penalty scored) Satyajit Chatterjee

Salt Lake Stadium, Kolkata
Rovers Cup
7 January 2001
Semifinal

East Bengal	0–1	Mohun Bagan
		Amar Ganguly

Cooperage Ground, Mumbai
National Football League
17 February 2001
1st leg

East Bengal	1–0	Mohun Bagan
Omolaja Olalekan 48'	Report

Salt Lake Stadium, Kolkata
National Football League
10 April 2001
1st leg

Mohun Bagan	0–0	East Bengal

Salt Lake Stadium, Kolkata

=== 2001–02 ===
Calcutta Football League
11 August 2001
1st leg

Mohun Bagan	1–0	East Bengal
James Singh

Salt Lake Stadium, Kolkata
IFA Shield
6 October 2001
Semifinal

East Bengal	2–1	Mohun Bagan
Jo Paul Ancheri 25', 81'		José Ramirez Barreto 75'

Salt Lake Stadium, Kolkata
Calcutta Football League
11 October 2001
2nd leg

East Bengal	1–1	Mohun Bagan
Omolaja Olalekan		Renedy Singh

Salt Lake Stadium, Kolkata
National Football League
16 December 2001
1st leg

East Bengal	0–1	Mohun Bagan
		José Ramirez Barreto

Salt Lake Stadium, Kolkata
National Football League
11 March 2002
2nd leg

Mohun Bagan	1–0	East Bengal
José Ramirez Barreto

Salt Lake Stadium, Kolkata

=== 2002–03 ===
Calcutta Football League
20 August 2002
1st leg

Mohun Bagan	1–2	East Bengal
Basudeb Mondal		Dipankar Roy; Mama

Salt Lake Stadium, Kolkata
Calcutta Football League
17 September 2002
2nd leg

East Bengal	0–1	Mohun Bagan
		Basudeb Mondal

Salt Lake Stadium, Kolkata
National Football League
8 December 2002
1st leg

Mohun Bagan	0–2	East Bengal
		Subhasish; Alvito D'Cunha

Salt Lake Stadium, Kolkata
National Football League
25 February 2003
2nd leg

East Bengal	2–1	Mohun Bagan
Alvito D'Cunha; Mike Okoro		José Ramirez Barreto

Salt Lake Stadium, Kolkata

=== 2003–04 ===
Calcutta Football League
5 July 2003
1st leg

Mohun Bagan	0–3	East Bengal
		Suley Musah; Bhaichung Bhutia

Salt Lake Stadium, Kolkata
Calcutta Football League
4 September 2003
2nd leg

East Bengal	0–0	Mohun Bagan

Salt Lake Stadium, Kolkata
IFA Shield
28 September 2003
Final

East Bengal	0–0 (a.e.t.)	Mohun Bagan
	Report
Penalties
Suley Musah (penalty scored); Bijen Singh (penalty scored); Surkumar Singh (penalty scored); Muttah Suresh (penalty missed)	3–5	(penalty scored) José Ramirez Barreto; (penalty scored) Palash Karmakar; (penalty scored) Mehtab Hossain; (penalty scored) Sunil Chhetri; (penalty scored) Lolendra Singh

Salt Lake Stadium, Kolkata
Calcutta Football League
2 November 2003
Championship final

East Bengal	1–1 (a.e.t.)	Mohun Bagan
Suley Musah 60'		Ashim Biswas 23'
Penalties
	5–4

Salt Lake Stadium, Kolkata
National Football League
22 January 2004
1st leg

East Bengal	2–1	Mohun Bagan
Dipankar Roy; Mike Okoro		Ashim Biswas

Salt Lake Stadium, Kolkata
National Football League
25 April 2004
2nd leg

Mohun Bagan	1–2	East Bengal
Ashim Biswas		Bhaichung Bhutia; Cristiano Junior

Salt Lake Stadium, Kolkata

=== 2004–05 ===
Calcutta Football League
18 July 2004
1st leg

Mohun Bagan	1–1	East Bengal
Sunil Chhetri		Douglas Silva

Salt Lake Stadium, Kolkata
Calcutta Football League
11 September 2004
2nd leg

Mohun Bagan	0–0	East Bengal

Salt Lake Stadium, Kolkata
IFA Shield
8 October 2004
Semifinal

Mohun Bagan	1–1 (a.e.t.)	East Bengal
Beto 40'	Report	Mama 43'
Penalties
Beto (penalty scored); Eduardo Coelho (penalty scored); Noel Wilson (penalty scored); Amit Das (penalty scored); Ashim Biswas (penalty scored); Mehtab Hossain (penalty scored); Dulal Biswas (penalty scored)	7–6	(penalty scored) Paolo; (penalty scored) Climax Lawrence; (penalty scored) Sasthi Duley; (penalty scored) Madhab Das; (penalty scored) Mama; (penalty scored) Louis Aniweta; (penalty missed) Surya Bikash Chakraborty

Salt Lake Stadium, Kolkata
Durand Cup
10 November 2004
Final

Mohun Bagan	1–2	East Bengal
Douglas Silva 24'(o.g.)	Report	Chandan Das 24', 90+1'

Ambedkar Stadium, Delhi
Referee: P.K. Bose (Madhya Pradesh)
National Football League
12 January 2005
1st leg

East Bengal	0–0	Mohun Bagan
Chandan Das (yellow card) (yellow-red card) 66'

Salt Lake Stadium, Kolkata
National Football League
24 April 2005
2nd leg

Mohun Bagan	0–1	East Bengal
		Syed Rahim Nabi

Salt Lake Stadium, Kolkata

=== 2005–06 ===
Calcutta Football League
18 August 2005
1st leg

Mohun Bagan	1–0	East Bengal
Gley Yao Rodrigue	Report

Salt Lake Stadium, Kolkata
Referee: Dave Roberts
Calcutta Football League
3 September 2005
2nd leg

East Bengal	0–1	Mohun Bagan
	Report	Gley Yao Rodrigue

Salt Lake Stadium, Kolkata
IFA Shield
27 November 2005
Group league

East Bengal	4–1	Mohun Bagan
Chandan Das 9'; Mike Okoro 29'; Alvito D'Cunha 43', 90+3'		Akeem Abul Alem 14'

Salt Lake Stadium, Kolkata
National Football League
22 January 2006
1st leg

Mohun Bagan	0–0	East Bengal

Salt Lake Stadium, Kolkata
National Football League
8 April 2006
2nd leg

East Bengal	3–1	Mohun Bagan
Bhaichung Bhutia 48'; Mama 62'; Gouranga Dutta 89'		Mehtab Hossain 72'

Salt Lake Stadium, Kolkata

=== 2006–07 ===
Calcutta Football League
26 August 2006
1st leg

Mohun Bagan	1–0	East Bengal
Bhaichung Bhutia	Report

Salt Lake Stadium, Kolkata
Calcutta Football League
26 September 2006
2nd leg

East Bengal	0–1	Mohun Bagan
	Report	Ndem Guy Herve

Salt Lake Stadium, Kolkata
National Football League
27 February 2007
1st leg

East Bengal	1–0	Mohun Bagan
Saumik Dey 15'

Salt Lake Stadium, Kolkata
National Football League
15 April 2007
2nd leg

Mohun Bagan	2–1	East Bengal
José Ramirez Barreto 45+2'; Douglas Silva 71'		Edmilson Marques Pardal 30' (pen.)

Salt Lake Stadium, Kolkata

=== 2007–08 ===
Calcutta Football League
17 August 2007
1st leg

Mohun Bagan	4–3	East Bengal
Lalawmpuia Pachuau 9'; José Ramirez Barreto 34' (pen.); Venkatesh 42', 47'	Report	Alvito D'Cunha 46', 61'; Edmilson Marques Pardal 68' (pen.)

Salt Lake Stadium, Kolkata
Federation Cup
11 September 2007
Semifinal

East Bengal	3–2	Mohun Bagan
Surkumar Singh 25'; Dipendu Biswas 35'; Ashim Biswas 47'		Bhaichung Bhutia 12'; José Ramirez Barreto 71'

Guru Nanak Stadium, Ludhiana
Calcutta Football League
6 November 2007
2nd leg

East Bengal	0–2	Mohun Bagan
		José Ramirez Barreto 49', 90+2'

Salt Lake Stadium, Kolkata
I-League
30 December 2007
1st leg

Mohun Bagan	1–0	East Bengal
Bhaichung Bhutia 61'

Salt Lake Stadium, Kolkata
I-League
21 January 2008
2nd leg

East Bengal	0–2	Mohun Bagan
		Bhaichung Bhutia 29', 62'; Douglas Da Silva (yellow card) 9' (yellow-red card) 47'

Salt Lake Stadium, Kolkata
Referee: Dinesh Nair

=== 2008–09 ===
Calcutta Football League
5 August 2008
1st leg

Mohun Bagan	2–1	East Bengal
Lalawmpuia Pachuau 72', 82'		Alvito D'Cunha 19'

Salt Lake Stadium, Kolkata
Calcutta Football League
12 September 2008
2nd leg

East Bengal	1–1	Mohun Bagan
Edmilson Marques Pardal 84'		José Ramirez Barreto 25' (pen.)

Salt Lake Stadium, Kolkata
I-League
25 October 2008
1st leg

Mohun Bagan	1–1	East Bengal
Bhaichung Bhutia 2'		Syed Rahim Nabi 39'

Salt Lake Stadium, Kolkata
Federation Cup
18 December 2008
Semifinal

East Bengal	1–1 (a.e.t.)	Mohun Bagan
Sanju Pradhan 61'		José Ramirez Barreto 65'
Penalties
Parveen Kumar (penalty scored); Mehtab Hossain (penalty scored); Jayanta Sen (penalty scored); Sunil Chhetri (penalty missed)	3–5	(penalty scored) José Ramirez Barreto; (penalty scored) Marcos Pereira; (penalty scored) Lalkamal Bhowmick; (penalty scored) Lalawmpuia Pachuau; (penalty scored) James Singh

Salt Lake Stadium, Kolkata
I-League
22 February 2009
2nd leg

East Bengal	3–0	Mohun Bagan
Syed Rahim Nabi 22', 40'; Sunil Chhetri 47'

Salt Lake Stadium, Kolkata

=== 2009–10 ===
I-League
25 October 2009
1st leg

East Bengal	3–5	Mohun Bagan
Nirmal Chettri 9'; Yusif Yakubu 35', 44'	Report	Chidi Edeh 17', 33', 46', 66'; Manish Matthani 22'

Salt Lake Stadium, Kolkata
Federation Cup
31 December 2009
Semifinal

East Bengal	2–0	Mohun Bagan
Yusif Yakubu 48'; Mehtab Hossain 84'

Nehru Stadium, Guwahati
Calcutta Football League
24 April 2010

Mohun Bagan	0–0	East Bengal

Salt Lake Stadium, Kolkata
I-League
16 May 2010
2nd leg

Mohun Bagan	2–1	East Bengal
José Ramirez Barreto; Snehasish Chakraborty		Yusif Yakubu

Salt Lake Stadium, Kolkata

=== 2010–11 ===
Federation Cup
2 October 2010
Final

East Bengal	1–0	Mohun Bagan
Ozbey (penalty missed) 20'; Vashum 54'	Report

Barabati Stadium, Cuttack
Referee: Dinesh Nair
Md. Sporting Platinum Jubilee Cup
14 November 2010
Final

East Bengal	3–3 (a.e.t.)	Mohun Bagan
Alvito D'Cunha 45+1'; Robin Singh 76', 101'	Report	Satish Kumar 55'; Ashim Biswas 67'; Harpreet Singh 115'
Penalties
Sanju Pradhan (penalty scored); Robin Singh (penalty scored); Sushanth Mathew (penalty scored); Ravinder Kumar (penalty missed); Biswajit Natta (penalty missed)	3–2	(penalty missed) Souvik Chakraborty; (penalty missed) Snehashish Chakraborty; (penalty scored) Rahul Kumar; (penalty scored) Dipendu Duwary; (penalty missed) Gouranga Dutta

Salt Lake Stadium, Kolkata
Referee: Barun Saha
Calcutta Football League
26 November 2010

Mohun Bagan	0–2	East Bengal
	Report	Robin Singh 12', 60'

Salt Lake Stadium, Kolkata
Attendance: 90,000
Referee: Nivon Robesh Gamini
I-League
6 February 2011
1st leg

Mohun Bagan	1–1	East Bengal
José Ramirez Barreto 60'		Sanju Pradhan 48' (pen.)

Salt Lake Stadium, Kolkata
I-League
9 April 2011
2nd leg

East Bengal	2–1	Mohun Bagan
Tolgay Ozbey 7'; Baljit Sahni 54'	Report	Surkumar Singh 48'

Salt Lake Stadium, Kolkata
Referee: Deepak Singh

=== 2011–12 ===
I-League
20 November 2011
1st leg

Mohun Bagan	1–0	East Bengal
Odafa Onyeka Okolie 22' (pen.)	Report

Salt Lake Stadium, Kolkata
Attendance: 85,000
Referee: Pratap Singh
Calcutta Football League
7 January 2012

Mohun Bagan	2–0	East Bengal
Odafa Onyeka Okolie 22'; Manish Bhargav 31'	Report

Salt Lake Stadium, Kolkata
Referee: Ravshan Irmatov
I-League
4 February 2012
2nd leg

East Bengal	1–1	Mohun Bagan
Robin Singh 32'	Report	Odafa Onyeka Okolie 48'

Salt Lake Stadium, Kolkata
Referee: Santosh Kumar

=== 2012–13 ===
I-League
9 December 2012
1st leg

East Bengal	3–0 (Abandoned)	Mohun Bagan
Harmanjot Khabra 43'	Report	Odafa Onyeka Okolie (red card) 45'

Salt Lake Stadium, Kolkata
Attendance: 95,000
Referee: Vishnu Chauhan
I-League
9 February 2013
2nd leg

Mohun Bagan	0–0	East Bengal

Salt Lake Stadium, Kolkata
Referee: Santosh Kumar
IFA Shield
17 March 2013
Semifinal

East Bengal	1–1 (a.e.t.)	Mohun Bagan
Andrew Barisic 89'	Report	C. S. Sabeeth 46'
Penalties
Chidi Edeh (penalty scored); Andrew Barisic (penalty scored); Sanju Pradhan (penalty scored); Naoba Singh (penalty missed); Baljit Sahni (penalty scored)	4–2	(penalty missed) Odafa Onyeka Okolie; (penalty missed) Nirmal Chettri; (penalty scored) Jewel Raja; (penalty scored) Aiborlang Khongjee

Salt Lake Stadium, Kolkata
Attendance: 75,000
Referee: Santosh Kumar
Calcutta Football League
23 May 2013

East Bengal	3–2	Mohun Bagan
Chidi Edeh 22', 72'; Penn Orji 28'	Report	Odafa Onyeka Okolie 38'; Tolgay Ozbey 90+2'

Salt Lake Stadium, Kolkata
Attendance: 85,000
Referee: Santosh Kumar

=== 2013–14 ===
I-League
24 November 2013
1st leg

East Bengal	1–0	Mohun Bagan
Lalrindika Ralte 73'	Report

Salt Lake Stadium, Kolkata
Attendance: 90,000
Referee: Pratap Singh
Calcutta Football League
11 January 2014

East Bengal	0–1	Mohun Bagan
	Report	Katsumi Yusa 83'

Salt Lake Stadium, Kolkata
Attendance: 60,000
Referee: Pranjal Bannerjee
I-League
1 March 2014
2nd leg

Mohun Bagan	1–1	East Bengal
C. S. Sabeeth 67'	Report	James Moga 39'

Salt Lake Stadium, Kolkata
Referee: Santosh Kumar

=== 2014–15 ===
Calcutta Football League
31 August 2014

East Bengal	3–1	Mohun Bagan
Ranti Martins 13' (pen.), 50'; Joaquim Abranches 45'	Report	C. S. Sabeeth 21'

Salt Lake Stadium, Kolkata
Attendance: 70,000
Referee: Pranjal Bannerjee
I-League
17 February 2015
1st leg

East Bengal	1–1	Mohun Bagan
Ranti Martins 30'	Report	Pierre Boya 24'

Salt Lake Stadium, Kolkata
Attendance: 80,000
Referee: Pratap Singh
I-League
28 March 2015
2nd leg

Mohun Bagan	1–0	East Bengal
Balwant Singh 47'	Report

Salt Lake Stadium, Kolkata
Referee: Santosh Kumar

=== 2015–16 ===
Calcutta Football League
6 September 2015

East Bengal	4–0	Mohun Bagan
Do Dong-hyun 2', 38'; Mohammed Rafique 80'; Rahul Bheke 90+2'	Report	Dudu Omagbemi (yellow card) 37' (yellow-red card) 50'

Salt Lake Stadium, Kolkata
Attendance: 1,00,000
Referee: Ranjit Bakshi
I-League
23 January 2016
1st leg

Mohun Bagan	1–1	East Bengal
Cornell Glen 77'	Report	Ranti Martins 63'

Salt Lake Stadium, Kolkata
Attendance: 62,342
Referee: Rowan Arumughan
I-League
2 April 2016
2nd leg

East Bengal	2–1	Mohun Bagan
Do Dong-hyun 40' (pen.), 75'	Report	Katsumi Yusa 83'; Jeje (penalty missed) 90+2

Kanchenjunga Stadium, Siliguri
Attendance: 30,000
Referee: Santosh Kumar

=== 2016–17 ===
Calcutta Football League
7 September 2016

East Bengal	3–0 (Walkover)	Mohun Bagan
	Report

Kalyani Stadium, Kalyani
Referee: Pranjal Bannerjee
I-League
12 February 2017
1st leg

East Bengal	0–0	Mohun Bagan
	Report

Kanchenjunga Stadium, Siliguri
Attendance: 30,000
Referee: CR Srikrishna
I-League
9 April 2017
2nd leg

Mohun Bagan	2–1	East Bengal
Sony Norde 35'; Azharuddin Mallick 43'	Report	Rowllin Borges 90+2'; Willis Plaza (red card) 66'

Kanchenjunga Stadium, Siliguri
Attendance: 27,000
Referee: Rowan Arumughan
Federation Cup
14 May 2017
Semifinal

Mohun Bagan	2–0	East Bengal
Darryl Duffy 35'; Balwant Singh 84'	Report

Barabati Stadium, Cuttack
Referee: Santosh Kumar

=== 2017–18 ===
Calcutta Football League
24 September 2017

East Bengal	2–2	Mohun Bagan
Laldanmawia Ralte 44'; Mahmoud Amnah 66' (pen.); Surabuddin Mollick (red card) 87'	Report	Carlyle Mitchell 2' (o.g.); Ansumana Kromah 49' (pen.); Kingshuk Debnath (yellow card) 59' (yellow-red card) 84'

Kanchenjunga Stadium, Siliguri
Attendance: 27,000
Referee: Ranjit Bakshi
I-League
3 December 2017
1st leg

Mohun Bagan	1–0	East Bengal
Kingsley Obumneme 39'	Report

Salt Lake Stadium, Kolkata
Attendance: 64,630
Referee: CR Srikrishna
I-League
21 January 2018
2nd leg

East Bengal	0–2	Mohun Bagan
	Report	Aser Pierrick Dipanda 1', 35'

Salt Lake Stadium, Kolkata
Attendance: 52,000
Referee: CR Srikrishna

=== 2018–19 ===
Calcutta Football League
2 September 2018

East Bengal	2–2	Mohun Bagan
Jhonny Acosta 45+2'; Laldanmawia Ralte 61'	Report	Pintu Mahata 20'; Henry Kisekka 30'

Salt Lake Stadium, Kolkata
Attendance: 66,182
Referee: Pranjal Bannerjee
I-League
16 December 2018
1st leg

East Bengal	3–2	Mohun Bagan
Laldanmawia Ralte 17', 61'; Jobi Justin 44'	Report	Kingsley Obumneme (yellow card) (yellow-red card) 12' 59'; Azharuddin Mallick 13'; Aser Pierrick Dipanda 75'

Salt Lake Stadium, Kolkata
Attendance: 64,867
Referee: Venkatesh R
I-League
27 January 2019
2nd leg

Mohun Bagan	0–2	East Bengal
		Jaime Santos 35'; Jobby Justin 75'

Salt Lake Stadium, Kolkata
Attendance: 62,628
Referee: C.R. Srikrishna

=== 2019–20 ===
Calcutta Football League
1 September 2019

Mohun Bagan	0–0	East Bengal

Salt Lake Stadium, Kolkata
Attendance: 65,000
Referee: C.R. Srikrishna
I-League
19 January 2020
1st leg

Mohun Bagan	2–1	East Bengal
Joseba Beitia 18'; Baba Diawara 65'		Marcos de la Espada 71'

Salt Lake Stadium, Kolkata, West Bengal
Attendance: 63,756
Referee: Ajitkumar Meitei
I-League
15 March 2020
2nd leg

East Bengal	Cancelled (Note: Match was cancelled due to COVID-19 pandemic)	Mohun Bagan

Salt Lake Stadium, Kolkata, West Bengal

=== 2020–21 ===
Indian Super League
27 November 2020
1st leg

East Bengal	0–2	Mohun Bagan
	Report	Krishna 49'; Manvir 85'

Tilak Maidan Stadium, Vasco da Gama, Goa
Attendance: 0 (Note: Due to the COVID-19 pandemic in India, the 2020–21 Indian Super League was held entirely in Goa, inside closed doors and East Bengal was allotted the Tilak Maidan Stadium as their home ground for the season while Mohun Bagan were allotted the Fatorda Stadium.)
Referee: C R Srikrishna
Indian Super League
19 February 2021
2nd leg

Mohun Bagan	3–1	East Bengal
Krishna 15'; Williams 72'; Hernandez 89'	Report	Tiri 41' (o.g.)

Fatorda Stadium, Margao, Goa
Attendance: 0
Referee: Tejas Nagvenkar

=== 2021–22 ===
Indian Super League
27 November 2021
1st leg

East Bengal	0–3	Mohun Bagan
	Report	Krishna 14'; Manvir 14'; Colaco 23'

Tilak Maidan Stadium, Vasco da Gama, Goa
Attendance: 0 (Note: Due to the COVID-19 pandemic in India, the 2021–22 Indian Super League would also be held entirely in Goa, behind closed doors. East Bengal is allotted the Tilak Maidan Stadium as their home ground for the season while Mohun Bagan is allotted the Fatorda Stadium.)
Referee: Rahul Kumar Gupta
Indian Super League
29 January 2022
2nd leg

Mohun Bagan	3–1	East Bengal
Nassiri 64', 90+3', 90+5'	Report	Sidoel 56'

Fatorda Stadium, Margao, Goa
Attendance: 0
Referee: Crystal John

=== 2022–23 ===
Durand Cup
28 August 2022
18:00 IST
Group stage

East Bengal	0–1	Mohun Bagan
	Report	Passi 45+2' (o.g.)

Salt Lake Stadium, Kolkata
Attendance: 61,787
Referee: C R Srikrishna
Indian Super League
29 October 2022
19:30 IST
1st Leg

Mohun Bagan	2–0	East Bengal
Boumous 56'; Manvir 65'	Report

Salt Lake Stadium, Kolkata
Attendance: 62,252
Referee: C R Srikrishna
Indian Super League
25 February 2023
19:30 IST
2nd Leg

East Bengal	0–2	Mohun Bagan
	Report	Damjanović 68'; Petratos 90'

Salt Lake Stadium, Kolkata
Attendance: 60,102
Referee: Cystal John

=== 2023–24 ===
Durand Cup
12 August 2023
16:45 IST
Group stage

Mohun Bagan	0–1	East Bengal
	Report	Sekar 60'

Vivekananda Yuba Bharati Krirangan, Kolkata
Attendance: 55,857
Referee: Harish Kundu
Durand Cup
3 September 2023
16:00 IST
Final

East Bengal	0–1	Mohun Bagan
	Report	Thapa (yellow card) 45+3' (yellow-red card) 62'; Petratos 71'

Vivekananda Yuba Bharati Krirangan, Kolkata
Attendance: 59,797
Referee: Rahul Kumar Gupta
Calcutta Football League
30 November 2023
13:30 IST
Super–Six

East Bengal	3–0 (Walkover)	Mohun Bagan
	Report

Bankimanjali Stadium, Naihati
Referee: Tanmoy Dhar
Super Cup
19 January 2024
19:30 IST
Group stage

Mohun Bagan	1–3	East Bengal
Yuste 19'; Petratos (penalty missed) 45+5'	Report	Silva 24', 80'; Sekar 63'

Kalinga Stadium, Bhubaneshwar
Attendance: 6,457
Referee: R. Venkatesh
Indian Super League
3 February 2024
19:30 IST
1st Leg

Mohun Bagan	2–2	East Bengal
Sadiku 17'; Petratos 87'	Report	Chhetri 3'; Silva 55' (pen.)

Vivekananda Yuba Bharati Krirangan, Kolkata
Attendance: 57,983
Referee: Rahul Kumar Gupta
Indian Super League
10 March 2024
20:30 IST
2nd Leg

East Bengal	1–3	Mohun Bagan
Silva (penalty missed) 14'; Crespo 53'	Report	Cummings 27'; Colaco 37'; Petratos 45+3' (pen.)

Vivekananda Yuba Bharati Krirangan, Kolkata
Attendance: 59,845
Referee: Tejas Nagvenkar

=== 2024–25 ===
Calcutta Football League
13 July 2024
15:15 IST
Group League

Mohun Bagan	1–2	East Bengal
Bhat 90+6'	Report	Vishnu 51'; Jesin 65'; Joseph Justin (yellow card) 46' (yellow-red card) 77'

Vivekananda Yuba Bharati Krirangan
Attendance: 26,000
Referee: Pranjal Banerjee
Durand Cup
18 August 2024
19:00 IST
Group League

Mohun Bagan	Cancelled	East Bengal
	Report

Vivekananda Yuba Bharati Krirangan, Kolkata
Exhibition Match: Chief Minister's Cup
2 September 2024
18:00 IST
Friendly

Mohun Bagan	1–1	East Bengal
Bhat 18'	Report	Muhammed K. Ashique 71'; Banerjee (yellow card) 60' (yellow-red card) 79'
Penalties
Serto Worneilen Kom (penalty scored); Sibajit Singh (penalty missed); Adil Abdulla (penalty scored); Leewan Castanha (penalty missed); Ravi Bahadur Rana (penalty scored)	3–2	(penalty missed) Tanmay Das; (penalty missed) P. V. Vishnu; (penalty scored) Muhammed K. Ashique; (penalty missed) Muhammed Musharaf; (penalty scored) Chaku Mandi

K. D. Singh Babu Stadium, Lucknow
Referee: K. Ashwin
Indian Super League
19 October 2024
19:30 IST
1st leg

East Bengal	0–2	Mohun Bagan
		Maclaren 42'; Petratos 89' (P)

Vivekananda Yuba Bharati Krirangan, Kolkata, India
Attendance: 59,782
Indian Super League
11 January 2025
19:30 IST
2nd leg

Mohun Bagan	1–0	East Bengal
Maclaren 2'	Report	Chakrabarti (yellow card) 39' (yellow-red card) 64'

Indira Gandhi Athletic Stadium, Guwahati
Attendance: 2,567
Referee: Venkatesh Ramachandran

=== 2025–26 ===
Calcutta Football League
26 July 2025
17:30 IST
Group League

East Bengal	3–2	Mohun Bagan
Jesin 9'; Banerjee 45+6'; Aman (yellow card) 63' (yellow-red card) 90+8'; Lalhlansanga 69'	AIFF; I-League	Castanha 53'; Kiyan 67'

Kalyani Stadium, Kalyani
Attendance: 14,350
Referee: Aditya Purkayastha
Man of the Match: Sayan Banerjee (East Bengal)
Durand Cup
17 August 2025
19:00 IST
Quarter-finals

Mohun Bagan	1–2	East Bengal
Thapa 68'	Report; PDF Report	Diamantakos 38' (pen.), 52'

Vivekananda Yuba Bharati Krirangan, Kolkata
Attendance: 58,676
Referee: Venkatesh Ramachadran
Man of the Match: Dimitrios Diamantakos (East Bengal)
IFA Shield
18 October 2025
18:00 IST
Final

Mohun Bagan	1–1 (a.e.t.)	East Bengal
Cummings (penalty missed) 34'; Apuia 45+3'	AIFF; I-League	Ahadad 36'
Penalties
(penalty scored) Robson; (penalty scored) Manvir; (penalty scored) Liston; (penalty scored) Petratos; (penalty scored) Mehtab	5–4	(penalty scored) Miguel; (penalty scored) Sibille; (penalty scored) Mahesh; (penalty missed) Jay; (penalty scored) Ibusuki

Vivekananda Yuba Bharati Krirangan, Kolkata
Attendance: 50,236
Referee: Venkatesh Ramachadran
Man of the Match: Naorem Mahesh (East Bengal)
Super Cup
31 October 2025
19:30 IST
Group stage

Mohun Bagan	0–0	East Bengal
	AIFF; I-League

Fatorda Stadium, Margao
Attendance: 1,245
Referee: Harish Kundu
Man of the Match: Alberto Rodriguez (Mohun Bagan)
Indian Super League
17 May 2026
19:30 IST

Mohun Bagan	1–1	East Bengal
Cummings 90'	AIFF; I-League	Lalrindika 85' (yellow card) 86' (yellow-red card) 90+8'

Vivekananda Yuba Bharati Krirangan, Kolkata
Attendance: 62,201
Referee: Venkatesh Ramachadran
Man of the Match: Miguel Figueira (East Bengal)

=== 2026–27 ===
Durand Cup
25 July 2026
17:00 IST
Group stage

East Bengal	0–1	Mohun Bagan
	Report; PDF Report	Sahal Abdul Samad 53'

Vivekananda Yuba Bharati Krirangan, Kolkata
Attendance: 32,870
Referee: Lakshay
Man of the Match: Vishal Kaith (Mohun Bagan)
Durand Cup
23 August 2026
17:00 IST
Final

East Bengal	4–1	Mohun Bagan
Bipin 10'; Lalrindika 11', 22', 44'	Report; PDF Report	Manvir 33'

Vivekananda Yuba Bharati Krirangan, Kolkata
Attendance: 60,129
Referee: Aditya Purakayastha
Man of the Match: Edmund Lalrindika (East Bengal)
Calcutta Football League
7 September 2026
17:00 IST
Group League

East Bengal	1–1	Mohun Bagan
Bilal 65'	Report; PDF Report	Manvir 39'

Barasat Stadium, Barasat
Attendance: 10,500
Referee: Surojit Das
Man of the Match: Mohamed Bilal (East Bengal)
IFA Shield
8 October 2026
18:15 IST
Final

East Bengal	0–1	Mohun Bagan
	Report; PDF Report	Samir Zeljković 40'

Vivekananda Yuba Bharati Krirangan, Kolkata
Attendance: 52,730
Referee: Pratik Mondal
Man of the Match: Dejan Dražić (Mohun Bagan)

== Trophy Count ==
=== Major and Minor Honours (International, National and State) ===
This following table includes only those titles recognised and organised by the AFC, AFF, AIFF, ANFA, IFA, SFA, WIFA, DSA and other associations:

Type	Associaltion	Competition	Mohun Bagan	East Bengal	Ref.
International	AFF	ASEAN Club Championship	0	1	
International	AFC	Central Asia Champions' Cup	0	1	
International	ANFA	Wai Wai Cup	0	1	
International	ANFA	San Miguel International Cup	0	1	
International	Total		0	4	
National	AIFF	NFL/I-League/Indian Super League	7	4	
National	AIFF	ISL Cup	2	0	
National	AIFF	Federation Cup/Super Cup	14	9	
National	AIFF	Durand Cup	17	17	
National	AIFF	Indian Super Cup	2	3	
National	Total		42	33	
Domestic (Major)	WIFA	Rovers Cup	14	10	
Domestic (Major)	IFA	IFA Shield	22	29	
Domestic (Major)	IFA	Calcutta Football League	31	41	
Domestic (Major)	IFA	Trades Cup	11	4	
Domestic (Major)	IFA	Cooch Behar Cup	18	5	
Domestic (Major)	Total		95	89	
Domestic (Minor)	SFA	Sikkim Gold Cup	10	0	
Domestic (Minor)	DGHSA	Darjeeling Gold Cup	3	5	
Domestic (Minor)	DSA	DCM Trophy	1	7	
Domestic (Minor)	GSA	Bordoloi Trophy	7	5	
Domestic (Minor)	IFA	All Airlines Gold Cup	8	7	
Domestic (Minor)	IFA	Lakshmibilas Cup	7	3	
Domestic (Minor)	IFA	Raja Memorial Shield	5	1	
Domestic (Minor)	IFA	Lady Hardinge Shield	6	1	
Domestic (Minor)	IFA	Gladstone Cup	4	1	
Domestic (Minor)	IFA	Griffith Shield	4	2	
Domestic (Minor)	IFA	McDowell's Cup	1	3	
Domestic (Minor)	IFA	William Younger Cup	3	2	
Domestic (Minor)	Total		59	37	
Cumulative Total			197	163	

== Statistics ==
=== Top scorers ===
No	Name	Goals for Mohun Bagan	Goals for East Bengal	Total
1	(India) Bhaichung Bhutia	6	13	19
2	(Brazil) José Ramirez Barreto	17	–	17
3	(Nigeria) Chima Okorie	6	10	16
4	(India) Sisir Ghosh	8	3	11
5	(India) Mohammed Habib	0	10	10
6	(India) Shyam Thapa	6	3	9

=== Hat-tricks ===
Hat-tricks in Kolkata Derby
Date	Name	Team	Score	Tournament
5 September 1934	Amiya Deb^{4} (4 goals)	Mohun Bagan	Mohun Bagan 4–1 East Bengal	Darbhanga Shield (Bengal Zone India Section Semi Final)
6 August 1937	Asit Ganguly (3 goals)	Mohun Bagan	Mohun Bagan 4–0 East Bengal	Raja Shield (Final)
13 July 1997	Baichung Bhutia (3 goals)	East Bengal	East Bengal 4–1 Mohun Bagan	Federation Cup (Semi Final)
25 October 2009	Chidi Edeh^{4} (4 goals)	Mohun Bagan	Mohun Bagan 5–3 East Bengal	I-League
29 January 2022	Kiyan Nassiri (3 goals)	Mohun Bagan	Mohun Bagan 3–1 East Bengal	Indian Super League
23 August 2026	Edmund Lalrindika (3 goals)	East Bengal	East Bengal 4–1 Mohun Bagan	Durand Cup Final

^{4} Scored 4 goals

=== Foreign referee in Kolkata Derby ===
Foreign referee in Kolkata Derby
Date	Nationality	Name	Match score	Tournament
18 August 2005	England	Dave Roberts	Mohun Bagan; 1–0; East Bengal	2005-06 CFL
26 November 2010	Sri Lanka	Gamini Nivon Robesh	Mohun Bagan; 0–2; East Bengal	2010-11 CFL
7 January 2012	Uzbekistan	Ravshan Irmatov	East Bengal; 0–2; Mohun Bagan	2011-12 CFL

== Bibliography ==
Books

- Goswami, Ramesh Chandra (1963). East Bengal Cluber Itihas (in Bengali). Kolkata: Book Garden.
- Bandyopadhyay, Santipriya (1979). Cluber Naam East Bengal (in Bengali). Kolkata: New Bengal Press.
- Chattopadhyay, Hariprasad (2017). Mohun Bagan-East Bengal (in Bengali). Kolkata: Parul Prakashan.
- Mukhopadhyay, Subir (2017). Sonay Lekha Itihashe Mohun Bagan (in Bengali). Kolkata: Nabajatak.
