= 2004 Indian Federation Cup =

2004 Federation Cup
Tournament details
- Country: India
- Dates: 24 November–5 December 2004
- Teams: 16

Final positions
- Champions: Dempo (1st title)
- Runners-up: Mohun Bagan
- AFC Cup: Dempo

Tournament statistics
- Matches played: 15
- Goals scored: 38 (2.53 per match)
- Top goal scorer: Cristiano Junior (5 goals)

2004 Federation Cup was the 26th edition of the prestigious Federation Cup tournament, organised by All India Football Federation. Dempo SC lifted their inaugural trophy in this edition.

== Teams ==
Total 16 teams i.e. 12 National Football League teams and top-4 second division sides of that season participated in this edition.

== Bracket ==
Prelims
24 November
Fransa-Pax	3
Mahindra United	2
24 November
Tollygunge Agragami (p)	1 (4)
Salgaocar	1 (1)
25 November
Dempo	3
Eveready Association	1
25 November
Vasco	0 (7)
Churchill Brothers (p)	0 (8)
27 November
HAL	0
East Bengal	1
27 November
SC Goa	2
Mohammedan	0
27 November
JCT	2
SBT	1
26 November
Mohun Bagan	1
Indian Bank	0

Quarter-finals
28 November
Fransa-Pax	0
Tollygunge Agragami	3
29 November
Dempo	1
Churchill Brothers	0
30 November
East Bengal	0
SC Goa	1
30 November
JCT	1
Mohun Bagan	4

Semi-finals
3 December
Tollygunge Agragami	3
Dempo	4
3 December
SC Goa	0
Mohun Bagan (a.e.t.)	1

Final
5 December
Dempo	2
Mohun Bagan	0

== Prelims ==
25 November 2004

Churchill Brothers	0–0 (a.e.t.)	Vasco
Penalties
	8–7

Bangalore Football Stadium, Bengaluru

27 November 2004

East Bengal	1–0	HAL
Alvito 84'

Bangalore Football Stadium, Bengaluru

27 November 2004

SC Goa	2–0	Mohammedan
Ajay 28'; Rodrigues 48'

Bangalore Football Stadium, Bengaluru

26 November 2004

Mohun Bagan	1–0	Indian Bank
James 84'

Bangalore Football Stadium, Bengaluru

24 November 2004

Tollygunge Agragami	1–1 (a.e.t.)	Salgaocar
Bose 27'		Rasaq 75'
Penalties
	4–1

Bangalore Football Stadium, Bengaluru

24 November 2004

Fransa-Pax	3–2	Mahindra United
Endro 4'; Dias 74'; Rodrigues 80'		Yadav 43', 76'

Bangalore Football Stadium, Bengaluru

25 November 2004

Dempo	3–1	Eveready Association
Martins 5', 76'; Cristiano Jr 79'		Sen 58'

Bangalore Football Stadium, Bengaluru

27 November 2004

JCT	2–1	SBT
M. Singh 7', 42'		Naushad 21'

Bangalore Football Stadium, Bengaluru

== Quarter-finals ==
29 November 2004

Churchill Brothers	0–1	Dempo
		Cristiano Jr 80'

Bangalore Football Stadium, Bengaluru

30 November 2004

East Bengal	0–1	SC Goa
		Dudu 87'

Bangalore Football Stadium, Bengaluru

28 November 2004

Fransa-Pax	0–3	Tollygunge Agragami
		Datta 51'; Ahmed 65'; Bose 86'

Bangalore Football Stadium, Bengaluru

30 November 2004

Mohun Bagan	4–1	JCT
Mendes 29', 86'; Chhetri 44'; Biswas 78'		J. Singh 64'

Bangalore Football Stadium, Bengaluru

== Semi-finals ==
3 December 2004

Dempo	4–3	Tollygunge Agragami
Cristiano Jr 27'; Martins 30', 45', 86'		Bose 14'; Musah 40'; Awoyemi 89'

Bangalore Football Stadium, Bengaluru

3 December 2004

Mohun Bagan	1–0 (a.e.t.)	SC Goa
T. Singh 107'

Bangalore Football Stadium, Bengaluru

== Final ==
5 December 2004

Dempo	2–0	Mohun Bagan
Cristiano Jr 42', 78'

Bangalore Football Stadium, Bengaluru

Cristiano Junior collided with Mohun Bagan goalkeeper Subrata Pal, in the 78th minute after scoring the winning goal of final match. While scoring his second goal after chasing the ball into the box, he collided with the keeper, staggered away and then collapsed. Attempts to revive him were unsuccessful. He was declared dead on bringing the body into nearby hospital.
