= 2006 Indian Super Cup =

- Event: 2006 Indian Super Cup
Mahindra United	East Bengal
1	2
- Date: 27 May 2006
- Venue: Cooperage Ground, Mumbai
- Referee: S Suresh (Tamil Nadu)
- Attendance: 5,000 (est.)

The 2006 Indian Super Cup was the 6th Indian Super Cup, an annual football match contested by the winners of the previous season's National Football League and Federation Cup competitions. However, since Mahindra United won both the 2005–06 National Football League and the 2005 Indian Federation Cup, the match was between Mahindra United and East Bengal (runner's up of the 2005–06 National Football League), with East Bengal winning 2–1 to clinch their second Super Cup title. The match was played at Cooperage Ground, Mumbai, on 27 May 2006.

== Summary ==
Mahindra United had the best ever season in their history by winning the 2005–06 National Football League and the 2005 Federation Cup. The team coached by Derrick Pereira had been one of the consistent performers throughout the season, losing just 3 matches in the entire league. East Bengal on the other hand missed out on the National League title, finishing second by five points. Coached by Belgian manager Philippe De Ridder, East Bengal wanted to end the season on a high.

Mahindra United fielded a strong lineup, wanting to complete the hat-trick of trophies for the season with Yusif Yakubu and Jose Ramirez Barreto both starting upfront. However, Belgian coach Philippe De Ridder had made other plans as East Bengal dominated the proceedings and won the game by 2–1. Nigerian attacker Guy Ndem Herve opened the scoring with a header off Alvito D'Cunha's corner in the 23rd minute and just 10 minutes later, Alvito scored directly from the corner to put East Bengal two nil ahead. The defensive pairing of Guy Mertial and Muttah Suresh with Sashti Duley as right-back did their job perfectly to stop the dangerous duo of Yakubu and Barreto. Yakubu did reduce the margin in the second half but it was a mere consolation as East Bengal went on to lift their second Indian Super Cup title.

=== Match details ===
27 May 2006
5 PM IST

Mahindra United	1–2	East Bengal
Yusif Yakubu 65'	Report	Guy Ndem Herve 23'; Alvito D'Cunha 33'

Cooperage Ground, Mumbai
Attendance: 5,000 (est.)
Referee: S Suresh (Tamil Nadu)

Mahindra United	East Bengal

GK	1	(India) Subhasish Roy Chowdhury
RB	7	(India) Sushanth Mathew
CB	18	(India) Peter Siddqiue
CB	14	(India) Mahesh Gawli
LB	4	(India) Deepak Mondal
CM	28	(India) Krishnan Nair Ajayan
CM	6	(India) Shanmugam Venkatesh
LW	9	(India) Surojit Bose	(substituted off) 32'
RW	23	(India) Steven Dias
ST	8	(Brazil) Jose Ramirez Barreto (c)
ST	10	(Ghana) Yusif Yakubu
Substitutes:
MF	19	(Ghana) David Adjei		(substituted on) 32'
Manager:
(India) Derrick Pereira

GK	24	(India) Rajat Ghosh Dastidar (c)
LB	19	(India) Syed Rahim Nabi
CB	26	(Cameroon) Ngassa Ewane Guy Martial
CB	2	(India) Muttah Suresh
RB	8	(India) Sasthi Duley	(substituted off) 77'
LW	22	(India) Debabrata Roy
CM	7	(India) Jayanta Sen
CM	9	(India) Alvito D'Cunha	(substituted off) 67'
RW	28	(India) Shylo Malsawmtluanga	(substituted off) 54'
ST	20	(Cameroon) Ndem Guy Herve
ST	32	(India) Gouranga Dutta
Substitutes:
MF	6	(India) Dipankar Roy	(substituted on) 54'
MF	11	(India) Kalia Kulothungan	(substituted on) 67'
DF	16	(India) Covan Lawrence	(substituted on) 77'
Manager:
(Belgium) Philippe De Ridder

Assistant referees:
Dinesh Nair (Gujarat)
Benjamin Silva (Goa)
Fourth official:
Franky Fernandes (Goa)

MAN OF THE MATCH

- Alvito D'Cunha (East Bengal)

MATCH RULES

- 90 minutes.
- Penalty shootout if scores still level.
- Maximum of three substitutions.
