= Amiya Deb =

Indian sportsman (1917–1983)

Personal information
- Full name: Amiya Kumar Deb
- Date of birth: 16 November 1917
- Place of birth: Calcutta, British India
- Date of death: 10 February 1983 (aged 65)
- Place of death: Calcutta, India

Senior career*
Years	Team	Apps	(Gls)
- Mohun Bagan
- * Club domestic league appearances and goals

Amiya Kumar Deb (Bengali: অমিয় কুমার দেব; 16 November 1917 – 10 January 1983) was an Indian sportsman active in the 1930s and 1940s who played association football, cricket and field hockey.

== Playing career ==
Deb played football for Mohun Bagan, and cricket for Bengal. He is the first footballer who scored a hat-trick in Mohun Bagan vs East Bengal match, known as the Kolkata Derby. He scored all 4 goals in darbhanga shield (one of the most difficult tournaments in those days after Calcutta Football League and IFA Shield) in 1934 (on 5 September 1934) for Mohun Bagan against East Bengal. It was the Bengal zone, India section semifinal match of Darbhanga shield. Mohun Bagan won the match 4–1.

He also scored in darbhanga shield Bengal zone India section final match of 1933 (on 30 August 1933) and Mohun Bagan won the match 2–0. Amiyo deb scored several goals in the Mohun Bagan vs East Bengal match in the 1930s. Asit Ganguly scored the second hat trick in this Mohun Bagan vs East Bengal derby in Raja Memorial Shield final, which got played in their common ground of Mohun Bagan and East Bengal on 6 August 1937 and Mohun Bagan won the match 4–0. East Bengal was the stronger side, but their goalkeeper Peary Das made few costly errors in that Raja Memorial Shield final. In the 1930s, decade Raja Memorial Shield used to be an important knock out tournaments in Kolkata Maidan, played by all big clubs.

== See also ==
- Football in Kolkata
- List of Kolkata Derby matches
