= Sydney Nkalanga =

South African soccer player

Personal information
- Full name: Sydney Bonginkosi Nkalanga
- Place of birth: South Africa

Youth career
- Wits University F.C.

Senior career*
Years	Team	Apps	(Gls)
2004–2005	Wits University F.C.		(3)
2005	East Bengal F.C.		
2003	Fransa-Pax FC (→loan)		
- FC Pratteln
- * Club domestic league appearances and goals

Sydney Bonginkosi Nkalanga is a South African former footballer.

== Career ==
=== India ===
Traded to East Bengal late 2005, Nkalanga did well with Mike Okoro up front at the 2005 Federation Cup, but was released by the Red & Yellow Brigade that winter before being loaned to Fransa-Pax and debuting as they scraped past Dempo SC with one point. However, the South African absconded on 6 March 2006 and decide to break off all contact with the club.
