= Philippe De Ridder =

Belgian football coach/administrator and former player

Personal information
- Date of birth: 6 August 1964 (age 62)
- Place of birth: Brussels, Belgium
- Position: Midfielder

Youth career
- captain Belgium national team -14, -16, -18, -20

Senior career*
Years	Team	Apps	(Gls)
1984–1985	RWD Molenbeek		
1985–1986	RWD Molenbeek		

Managerial career
- 2005–2006: East Bengal
- 2006–2007: Prayag United
- 2009–2010: East Bengal
- 2011–2013: United Sikkim
- 2014–2015: Reitlang FC
- 2015–2016: FC Adeli Batumi
- 2016–2017: Dayu FC
- 2017–2018: CD Marino
- * Club domestic league appearances and goals

Philippe De Ridder (born 6 August 1964 in Brussels, Belgium) is a Belgian coach, football administrator and a former football player. He is currently the co-owner and CEO of Chevsa Sports Marketing & Management, a Kolkata based sports marketing and management agency.

His latest assignment was as International Football Development Manager for the Spanish Club, CD Marino. De Ridder has been associated with the development of several football players in India, including Bhaichung Bhutia, Harmanjot Khabra and Mehtab Hossain. He has been credited with identifying players at an early stage of their careers, including Sandesh Jhingan and Lalruatthara. Jhingan later became one of the highest-valued players in Indian football, while Lalruatthara received the Emerging Player of the Year award in 2018. He was also associated with the use of the "360 method" training approach when working with experiences players. In additions to football coach, he has also worked as an art director, designer and musician.

== Playing career ==
=== Club ===
De Ridder played his professional football career in Belgium with the club RWD Molenbeek and he was part of the team which became Division 2 champions in 1985. He then played for RWD Molenbeek in the Belgium Premiership the next season. In 1985, a serious injury to both his knee and ankle stalled his playing career and forced him to retire.

=== International ===
He also represented Belgium in the Under 12 to Under 20 stage. He has also featured in the Under 18 European Championship for his country. He was captain of the Belgium national youth team where he played alongside several World Cup winners like Patrick Vervoort, Marc Degryse, Stéphane Demol and Filip De Wilde.

== Coaching career ==
After finishing his short playing career, De Ridder started coaching. He got his UEFA B license coaching degree in Belgium and then began his coaching career in the US. He then moved on to Brazil, Spain and Argentina, where he got his lessons in first-team coaching.

=== East Bengal ===
In 2005, he became the manager of one of the most successful clubs in Indian football, East Bengal, in mid-season. Under his coaching, East Bengal became the runners-up of the now defunct National Football League. His most notable event while with East Bengal was the victory against arch rivals Mohun Bagan in the biggest derby in Indian Football in front of 90,000 people. East Bengal then won the Super Cup in a one match face-off tournament against the 2005-06 NFL Premier Division champions, Mahindra United, beating them by a solitary goal.

=== Chirag United ===
After the 2005–06 season, De Ridder signed with Chirag United (now Prayag United) after resigning with East Bengal. His stay was short, as De Ridder could not qualify Chirag for the I-League 2nd Division.

=== Back to East Bengal ===
In 2009, he signed with East Bengal again during the mid phase of the I-League, when East Bengal was having the most disastrous season of their entire history. De Ridder then patched up the team from their miserable condition and went into the national level tournament Federation Cup as underdogs. De Ridder and his men defied all odds to return as champions of the tournament. East Bengal also defeated their arch rivals, Mohun Bagan, 2–0 on the way. This also provided East Bengal a ticket for the AFC Cup, a second-tier club tournament of the Asian Continent. He then left the club again due to complications with the board.

=== United Sikkim ===
On 3 December 2011, De Ridder was confirmed as manager of I-League 2nd Division club United Sikkim. Under his coaching, United Sikkim F.C. became the champions of I-League 2nd Division and were promoted to play in I-League for the 2012–13 season. After being manager of the team for some part of I-League, De Ridder decided to move to a different role of football director for United Sikkim.

=== Reitlang FC ===
In November 2013, De Ridder was confirmed as the Technical Director cum player of the club Mizoram premier league. The team was in a disastrous last position in the Mizoram Premier League with only 3 points after 7 matches. Under his coaching, Reitlang FC was saved from relegation with a total of 13 points, taking 10 points in the remaining 7 matches. Making several appearances as a player during the league, he became also the oldest player ever to have participated in the Mizoram Premier league.

=== FC Adeli Batumi (GEORGIA) ===
His next assignment took him to Georgia to work with FC Adeli Batumi. The club was battling relegation and was suffering from financial difficulties. He brought in new players and also made a historical transfer by bringing in an Indian player for the first time, Anupam Sarkar from FC Pune City to slot into an ailing defense. He also chipped in with valuable appearances in the defensive midfield whenever needed. The team shaped on well and for the first match against the league leaders who had beat them 6–0 in the first leg, earned a well deserved 1–1 draw. In that match, Batumi led by 1 goal, but conceded the lead due to an unmindful individual mistake in the closing few moments of the game. Batumi did very well, but the championship was cut down at the end due to some suspicion of abnormal betting movements in the competition (none that involved his team though).

=== Dayu FC ===
Ridder accepted the challenge of taking the role of Technical Director of Dayu FC in Beijing China - a football club created by a former star of Chinese football. While with Dayu, de Ridder started with setting up the development of the youth academy players with the 360 CFT method. Progress was evident and immediate. Organizing international exposure for players and producing attractive and efficient football players were the quintessential objectives. After 12 months the club was bought by investors from inner Mongolia. de Ridder continued to develop the team and the youth system working from the region of Hohhot.

== Player development ==
Throughout his career, De Ridder is known to work with players, developing their skill sets by applying the 360 CFT method. He has worked and discovered a lot of new players during his tenure in India.

=== East Bengal ===
During his two stints with Indian football giant East Bengal, De Ridder discovered footballers like Jayanta Sen, Anupam Sarkar, Budhiram Tudu etc. He also worked with senior players like Mehtab Hossain, Bhaichung Bhutia and Harmanjot Khabra to transform and develop their playing abilities. After training Mehtab Hossain with the 360 method, he went on to win the award of being the Best Player in India. This was when Hossain was on the verge of being removed from the East Bengal roster because of his poor performances and injury proneness in the previous seasons.

He was also responsible for giving opportunities to goalkeepers like Abhra Mondal and Gurpreet Singh Sandhu. Gurpreet went on to become the first ever Indian to play a competitive match for the first team of a top-division European club and the fifth Indian to play professionally in Europe. He is also the first Indian to play in the UEFA Europa League.

=== United Sikkim ===
Ridder's biggest find during his time with United Sikkim was Sandesh Jhingan. The defender was not even making the bench when De Ridder took over. However, after working in training with him, Jhingan developed drastically. De Ridder also provided Jhingan with a chance to become the first Indian player to go to China and trial for a club in the Chinese First Division Football League. Jhingan is currently a regular starter for the India National Football Team.

=== Reitlang FC ===
At Reitlang FC, De Ridder developed players like Cho Chering Lepcha and Lalruatthara. Ridder trained Lalruatthara with the 360 method, got him a trial in Thailand - BEC Tero Sasana, now known as Police Tero F.C. when not one person talked or detected him in the Mizoram Premier League. He is now elected as the best youth player of Super league 2018. He made his debut for India on 27 March 2018 against Kyrgyzstan in 2019 AFC Asian Cup Qualifiers. In July 2017, he was selected in final India U23 squad which travelled to Qatar to play 2018 AFC U-23 Championship qualification.

=== Dayu FC ===
In China, De Ridder worked with a young 18-year-old Chinese player for six months. He trained him every day with his 360 training method, thus allowing him to sign a pro-contract with Belgian club RSC Anderlecht. De Ridder also initiated the international development of Chinese U9, discovering 8 talented players and bringing them to the best youth football tournament in Belgium.

=== CD Marino ===
After discovering a young player from Ghana in China, De Ridder trained him with the 360 method for four months. He then brought him to sign a contract with CD Marino.

=== Goalkeepers ===
After developing the likes of Abhra Mondal and Gurpreet Singh Sandhu, De Ridder also became the first football coach in India to bring a foreign goalkeeper from South Korea to the I League.

== Experience around the world ==
=== Senegal - Dakar ===
De Ridder went to scout some players for CD Marino, develop international relations. He also shared the 360 Method with several local football academies.

=== Cameroon - Douala ===
De Ridder visited several local schools and football academies to scout local talents. He also shared his 360 Training Method as well as develop international relations.

=== International Football Development Manager ===
Developed International relations for the club, as well as discovered new foreign talent for the club outside the Canary Islands.

== Ridder's academies ==
Ridder had set up two academies of excellence in Belgium (Lions soccer Academy and 360 Foot) which were specialized in the individual development of skills, power and speed as well as goal scoring abilities. He also traveled for 13 years around the world, exchanging knowledge and working with several French, Dutch, Spanish, Ecuadorian, Brazilian, Argentinian and American coaches, youth coordinators and presidents around the world, to be able to put together a successful and creative training methodology. Many players participated for several years in these elite training centres, such as Faris Haroun (Blackpool), Arnor Angeli (Mons), Rosario Saporito (Diegem Sport), Fabio Tonini (FC Brussels), and Bernard Malanda-Adje (Wolfsburg). They all came to de Ridder when they had problems in their club to sustain their position in the first eleven and when all were normal and unknown players and they all became international players after receiving De Ridder's 360 CFT training and football philosophy. In India, De Ridder successfully implemented the 360 CFT method on a full professional team with East Bengal and gave some unknown Indian players a chance to express their talent. He has demonstrated his 360 CFT method at different places around the globe like Planet Football Academy (Togo) and IFA-CFS Soccer Academy (India).

== Honours ==
=== Player ===
RWD Molenbeek

- Belgian Second Division (Champion) : 1984–85

International

- Captain of the Belgium national youth team

=== Managerial ===
In his years of club management, Ridder has led his clubs to win several titles.

East Bengal (2005–2006, 2009–2010)

- Federation Cup (India) (Champion): 2009–10
- Indian Super Cup (Champion): 2006
- National Football League (India) (Runners-up) : 2005-06

United Sikkim FC (2011–2012, 2012–2013)

- I-League 2nd Division (Champion) : 2012

=== Individual ===
- Creator of the 360 CFT Method(Creative Football Training)
- Founder of Lions Soccer Academy and 360 Foot

== Other career ==
Ridder is an art director, photographer, cartoonist, dancer, musician, saxophone player, management professional, writer and a sports journalist.

=== Art director and designer ===
Ridder is a professional art director and graphic designer. He has worked with several international organizations such as Management Centre Europe and Tenue De Soiree Magazine (Brussels), Metropolitan Life Insurance, Morgan Stanley and AVI (Disney account) (New York City), Bowhaus and IMEDIA (AT&T account) (New Jersey), Telmark International (London) and LEON cultural magazine (Tenerife).

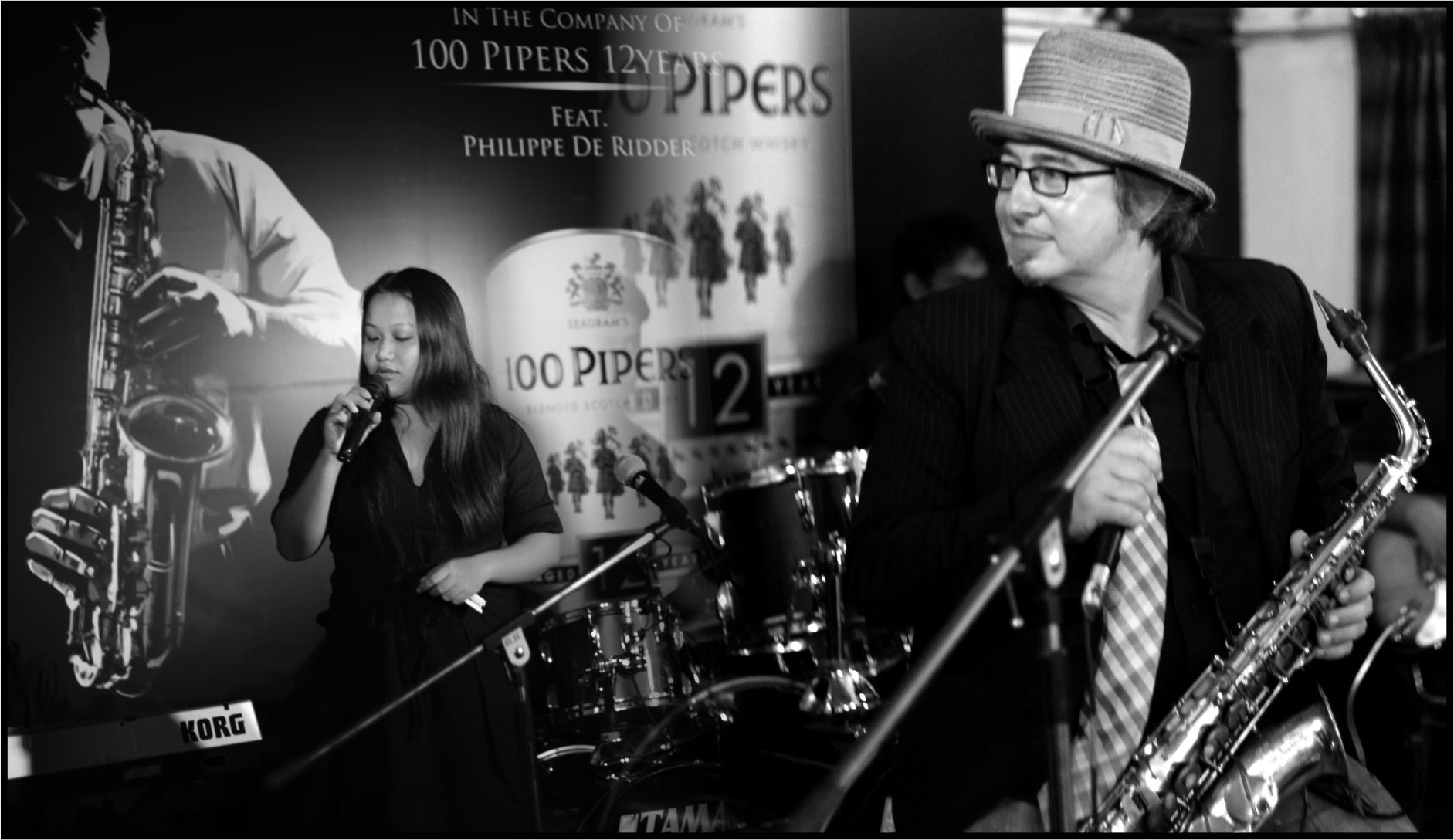
De Ridder performing at the Guwahati Club, India.

De Ridder is a saxophone player and performs a mix of original compositions, covers and story-telling with a touch of improvisation. He started in jam sessions with his professional musician friends at Brussels, and debuted on the Indian music scene with his performance at the Guwahati Club, Assam.

=== Media publicity ===
Ridder is a very popular figure in the city of Kolkata and in the media. He wrote a book in 2006 titled, Kolkata by Ridder, based on the "City of Joy", Kolkata, which was well received by the Kolkatans, especially the football lovers. In India, he worked for the Times of India and Bartaman as an expert guest journalist as well as a football expert on a Channel 10 television show and as a cartoonist for the Bengal Post during the 2010 FIFA World cup.

During the 2018 FIFA World Cup he drew some cartoons for India's leading Bengali Newspaper, Anandabazar Patrika. He also wrote several articles during the tournament as a football expert. He also worked as an expert for the biggest sports newspaper in Dakar, Senegal.

De Ridder has also written forward notice in two football books, written by cartoonist Bibek Sengupta.

He has also directed a pilot film for a series about football and travelling in Mumbai, India.

=== Management ===
Ridder had the chance to learn marketing and management skills from a very young age due to the injury which ended his playing career. He followed many high level professional courses like Lateral Thinking for Management by Edward De Bono, In search of Excellence by Tom Peters, Management and Motivation by E. Sulliman, Marketing and Management by Kotler-Dubois and Advanced Direct Marketing, Creative Thinking by R Van Oeck, at reputed institutes such as Management Centre Europe (Brussels) and Advanced Direct Marketing – Chamber of Commerce (Brussels). He also exercised his management skills in public relations, press group DH, at the FIFA World Cup, 1994 and with professional organizations as general manager at 360 Foot and the U19 Togo National team's European tour in Belgium.

=== Chevsa Sports Marketing & Management ===
Ridder is the co-owner of Chevsa Sports Marketing & Management, a Kolkata based sports marketing and management agency which has a stated mission to discover, develop and promote elite professional sportsmen as well as young talents, primarily in football and also other sports like cricket, boxing and tennis with the help of corporate and related governing bodies and supporting sporting institutions and clubs for the betterment of sports in the country.

== Personal ==
Ridder is popularly known as "Indi" among his fans, friends and colleagues. Ridder is also actively involved with social service. He has helped in raising fund through football and also sponsoring and giving free training to the orphaned and needy children in Africa, Belgium and India. Ridder can speak six languages; English, French, Dutch, Spanish and Italian fluently, and the others being Portuguese and German.

Ridder is actually referred as "the Tintin of Brussels football". He is presently preparing for an exhibition in Belgium, A tribute to Tintin. De Ridder was born in Brussels, Belgium just like Hergé, the creator of Tintin.
