= Jatin Singh Bisht =

Indian footballer

Personal information
- Full name: Jatin Singh Bisht
- Date of birth: 15 November 1981 (age 44)
- Place of birth: Nainital, Uttarakhand, India
- Position: Attacking midfielder

Senior career*
Years	Team	Apps	(Gls)
2000–2004	Salgaocar	50	(14)
2004–2005	Mahindra United	22	(5)
2005–2006	East Bengal	4	
2006–2007	Mohammedan Sporting	22	(3)
2007–2016	ONGC	60	(22)

International career
2002–2005	India	15	(1)
- * Club domestic league appearances and goals

Jatin Singh Bisht (born 15 November 1981) is an Indian former professional footballer who played as an attacking midfielder. During his playing career he played in the National Football League, I-League, and I-League 2nd Division with Salgaocar, Mahindra United, East Bengal, Mohammedan F.C and ONGC. He was also capped 15 times by India from 2002 to 2005.
