= Cristiano Júnior =

Brazilian footballer (1979-2004)

- Júnior with Dempo SC in 2004

Personal information
- Full name: Cristiano Sebastião de Lima Júnior
- Date of birth: 5 June 1979
- Place of birth: Brasília, Brazil
- Date of death: 5 December 2004 (aged 25)
- Place of death: Bangalore, India
- Position: Forward

Youth career
- Vasco da Gama

Senior career*
Years	Team	Apps	(Gls)
1997–2001	Vasco da Gama	11	(17)
1997	→ Brasília (loan)		
1998	→ Garça Futebol Clube (loan)		
2001	Olaria		
2001	Sampaio Corrêa		
2002	Criciúma		
2003	América (RN)		
2003–2004	East Bengal	24	(15)
2004	Dempo	4	(5)
- * Club domestic league appearances and goals

Cristiano Sebastião de Lima Júnior (5 June 1979 – 5 December 2004) was a Brazilian footballer who played as a forward for Dempo, before an on-field collision in India in the Federation Cup finals, with the goalkeeper of the opposing team led to his death.

== Career ==
Júnior, who was the highest-paid footballer in India, signed up for Dempo in September 2004. He had only recently moved to Dempo on a transfer from Kolkata's East Bengal where he had formed a potent strike partnership with India's footballer Baichung Bhutia in helping his team win the league title in the 2003-2004 season and reach the knock-out stages of the 2004 AFC Cup.

== Death ==
Júnior collided with Mohun Bagan goalkeeper Subrata Pal, in the 78th minute of the Federation Cup finals. While scoring his second goal after chasing the ball into the box, he collided with the keeper, staggered away and then collapsed. Attempts to revive him were unsuccessful. The game continued after Junior was taken off the field. He was dead on arrival at Hosmat Hospital. Hospital officials said that no doctors were requested to be at the ground during the Federation Cup match. "At no time, was the hospital requested to provide doctors, and no agreement or contract for doctors was made." Dempo won the Cup 2-0. According to the autopsy performed in the Bangalore Hospital (where Junior was moved from the stadium), the footballer died because of a heart stroke. The report also added that Júnior was not injured at the moment of the arrival to the health center.

Dempo announced that they would retire Júnior's #10 shirt. It filed a complaint of criminal negligence against Subrata Pal, Hosmat Hospital, and the Karnataka State Football Association, the local organizers. Pal was suspended for 2 months.

== Honours ==
=== Individual ===
- 2003-04 National Football League (India): Golden Boot (15 goals)

== See also ==
- List of association footballers who died while playing
