= HOSMAT =

HOSMAT multispecialty Hospital Pvt. Ltd.
- Location within Bangalore

Geography
- Location: Bangalore, Karnataka, India
- Coordinates: 12.96884°N 77.61373°E

Organisation
- Type: Specialist

Services
- Beds: 350
- Speciality: Orthopedics

Links
- Website: hosmathospitals.com
- Lists: Hospitals in India

HOSMAT multispecialty Hospital Private Limited is a multispeciality hospital in central Bangalore, India. It also includes Hosmat Joint Replacement Center and HOSMAT Neurosciences. It is currently undergoing expansion to 500 beds, which would make it the largest speciality hospital of its kind in Asia.

== Facilities ==
HOSMAT is a super major speciality hospital of 400 beds with 12 operation theatres in Bangalore, India.
