= Liswa Nduti =

Congolese footballer (born 1974)

Personal information
- Date of birth: 24 December 1974 (age 51)
- Place of birth: Zaire
- Height: 1.90 m (6 ft 3 in)
- Positions: Defender; midfielder

Senior career*
Years	Team	Apps	(Gls)
1996–2005	Manning Rangers	203	(22)
2005	East Bengal		
2007–2008	TCDK SLNA		

International career
2000–2003	DR Congo	4	(0)
- * Club domestic league appearances and goals

Liswa Nduti (born 24 December 1974) is a Congolese former professional footballer who played as a defender and midfielder. He spent most of his career with South African club Manning Rangers. He made four appearances for the DR Congo national team.

== Club career ==
=== South Africa ===
Nduti played at Manning Rangers for eight years, making at least 15 appearances in each year. In his first season, 1996–97, Manning Rangers won the league championship.

In March 2003, in a match against Jomo Cosmos, he played as a goalkeeper from the 82nd minute after goalkeeper Abram Kwenenyane had been sent off, pulling off some saves as the Mighty Maulers ran out 2–1 winners.

=== India ===
Heading to East Bengal towards late October 2005, the sweeper was gone from the Red & Gold Brigade early on, despite coach Subhash Bhowmick planning to experiment with him in different roles as they outclassed Air India 3–1 at the Federation Cup.

=== Vietnam ===
Known as 'Baby' in Vietnam, Nduti was with TCDK SLNA towards the end of 2007, putting in what was seen as an imperious display as they outclassed Ha Noi ACB 2–0, receiving Man of the Match.

Nduti trailed with Chinese second tier side Yanbian F.C. in 2009.

== International career ==
Nduti had four caps for DR Congo, including in the African Nations Cup qualifying.
