= Dulal Biswas =

Indian footballer (born 1973)

Personal information
- Full name: Dulal Biswas
- Date of birth: 17 November 1973 (age 52)
- Place of birth: Kolkata, West Bengal, India
- Height: 1.73 m (5 ft 8 in)
- Position: Defender

Senior career*
Years	Team	Apps	(Gls)
1993–1998	East Bengal	??	(??)
1999–2007	Mohun Bagan	??	(??)
2007–2010	Prayag United	??	(??)
- * Club domestic league appearances and goals

Dulal Biswas (born 17 November 1973) is an Indian former footballer who played for East Bengal, Mohun Bagan AC and Prayag United. He was the captain of East Bengal for the 1997–1998 season.

== Honours ==
East Bengal

- IFA Shield: 1994
- Rovers Cup: 1994

Mohun Bagan

- National Football League: 1999–2000, 2001–02
- Rovers Cup: 2000–01
- Sikkim Gold Cup: 2001
