= Shanmugam Venkatesh =

Indian footballer and manager

Personal information
- Date of birth: 23 November 1978 (age 47)
- Place of birth: Bangalore, Karnataka, India
- Height: 1.78 m (5 ft 10 in)
- Position: Attacking midfielder

Youth career
- ADE

Senior career*
Years	Team	Apps	(Gls)
1996–1997	Indian Telephone Industries		
1997–2000	Salgaocar		
2000–2002	Mahindra United		
2002–2003	East Bengal	17	(2)
2003–2007	Mahindra United	77	(12)
2007–2008	Mohun Bagan	12	(1)
2008–2014	Pune	105	(9)

International career^{‡}
2002	India U23		
1997–2006	India		

Managerial career
- 2015—2019: India (assistant coach)
- 2019−2022: Indian Arrows
- 2022: India U20
- 2022: East Bengal (assistant coach)
- * Club domestic league appearances and goals as of 24 December 2013 ‡ National team caps and goals as of 24 December 2013

Shanmugam Venkatesh (born 23 November 1978) is an Indian football coach and former professional footballer and currently, the assistant manager of East Bengal. He is an AFC A license coach.

== Playing career ==
In club football, Venkatesh appeared with Pune.

== Managerial career ==
He managed India U20 national team at the 2022 SAFF U-20 Championship. He guided them clinching title beating Bangladesh 5–2 in final. he also managed the team in 2023 AFC U-20 Asian Cup qualification in September. They travelled to Kuwait in October, faced Australia, Iraq and Kuwait, winning a single match, against hosts.

== Honours ==
=== Player ===
Salgaocar

- National Football League: 1998–99
- Federation Cup: 1997
- Durand Cup: 1999

East Bengal

- National Football League: 2002–03
- Durand Cup: 2002–03

Mahindra United

- National Football League: 2005–06
- Federation Cup: 2005
- Durand Cup: 2008

India

- SAFF Championship: 1997, 1999, 2005; third place: 2003

India U23

- LG Cup: 2002

Individual

- National Football League Best Player: 2001, 2003
- Karnataka Olympic Association Award: 2004
- AIFF Player of the Year: 2004–05

=== Manager ===
India U20

- SAFF U-20 Championship: 2022
