= 2009–10 Indian Federation Cup =

31st edition of the Federation Cup

2009–10 Federation Cup
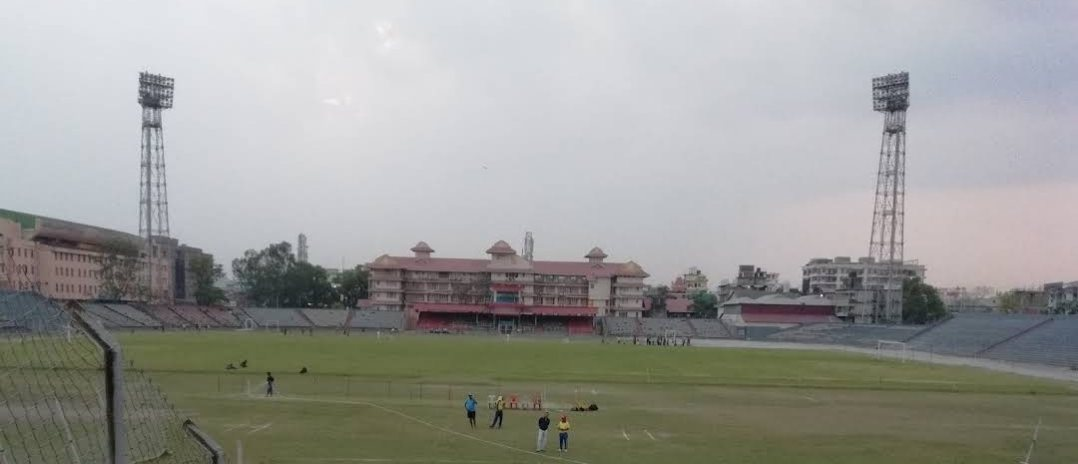
- Nehru Stadium hosted the final on 3 January 2010

Tournament details
- Country: India
- Dates: 21 December 2009 – 3 January 2010

Final positions
- Champions: East Bengal (6th title)
- Runners-up: Shillong Lajong
- AFC Cup: East Bengal

The 2009–10 Indian Federation Cup (known as Hero Honda Federation Cup for sponsorship reasons) was the 31st season of Indian Federation Cup. East Bengal defeated Shillong Lajong on penalties to win the competition in the final for their sixth time and earned a place in the 2010 AFC Cup. The league phase of the tournament was held in both Guwahati and Silchar.

== Group stage ==
=== Group A ===
Team	Pld	W	D	L	GF	GA	GD	Pts
(India) East Bengal	3	2	1	0	2	0	+2	7
(India) Salgaocar SC	3	1	1	1	2	2	0	4
(India) Viva Kerala	3	0	3	0	1	1	0	3
(India) JCT Mills Football Club	3	0	1	2	0	2	−2	1

22 Dec

East Bengal	0–0	Viva Kerala

JCT FC	0–1	Salgaocar

24 December 2009
Viva Kerala	0-0	JCT Mills Football Club
Salgaocar S.C	0-1	Kingfisher East Bengal
27 December 2009
Kingfisher East Bengal	1-0	JCT Mills Football Club
Viva Kerala	1-1	Salgaocar S.C

=== Group B ===
Team	Pld	W	D	L	GF	GA	GD	Pts
(India) Mohun Bagan	3	2	1	0	6	1	+5	7
(India) Mahindra United	3	2	0	1	3	3	0	6
(India) Chirag United SC	3	1	1	1	2	2	0	4
(India) Mohammedan	3	0	0	3	1	6	−5	0

21 December 2009
McDowell Mohun Bagan	4-1	Mohammedan SC
Mahindra United	2-1	Chirag United SC
23 December 2009
Chirag United SC	0-0	Mohun Bagan
Mohammedan SC	0-1	Mahindra United
26 December 2009
Chirag United SC	1-0	Mohammedan
Mahindra United	0-2	Mohun Bagan

Venue : Satindra Mohan Dev Stadium, Silchar

=== Group C ===
Team	Pld	W	D	L	GF	GA	GD	Pts
(India) Churchill Brothers SC	3	3	0	0	6	0	+6	9
(India) Mumbai FC	3	2	0	1	6	4	+2	6
(India) Sporting Clube de Goa	3	1	0	2	3	4	−1	3
(India) HAL Bangalore	3	0	0	3	2	9	−7	0

21 December 2009
Churchill Brothers SC	3-0	HAL Bangalore
Sporting Clube de Goa	1-2	Mumbai FC
23 December 2009
Mumbai FC	0-1	Churchill Brothers SC
HAL Bangalore	0-2	Sporting Clube de Goa
26 December 2009
Mumbai FC	4-2	HAL Bangalore
Churchill Brothers SC	2-0	Sporting Clube de Goa

=== Group D ===
Team	Pld	W	D	L	GF	GA	GD	Pts
(India) Shillong Lajong	3	1	2	0	5	4	+1	5
(India) Pune	3	1	2	0	4	3	+1	5
(India) Dempo SC	3	1	0	2	4	4	0	3
Air India	3	0	2	1	3	5	−2	2

22 December 2009
Dempo SC Pvt. Ltd.	1-2	Pune FC
Air India FC	2-2	Shillong Lajong FC
24 December 2009
Shillong Lajong FC	2-1	Dempo SC Pvt. Ltd.
Pune FC	1-1	Air India FC
27 December 2009
Shillong Lajong FC	1-1	Pune FC
Dempo SC Pvt. Ltd.	2-0	Air India FC

Venue : Nehru Stadium, Guwahati

== Semi-finals ==
In what was seen as a major upset, Shillong Lajong defeated defending I-League champions Churchill Brothers 1–0 in the first semi-final, thereby qualified for the final for their first time. East Bengal beat Mohun Bagan to make their 13th appearance in the final of the competition.

30 December 2009

Churchill Brothers	0–1	Shillong Lajong
	Report	Tuboi 29'

Nehru Stadium, Guwahati

31 December 2009

East Bengal	2–0	Mohun Bagan
Yakubu 56'; Hossain 88'

Nehru Stadium, Guwahati
Referee: Shaji Kurian (Kerala)

== Final ==
3 January 2010

Shillong Lajong	0–0 (a.e.t.)	East Bengal
	Report
Penalties
Gurung (penalty missed); Ramengmawia (penalty missed); Lyngshing (penalty missed)	0–3	Yakubu (penalty scored); Chettri (penalty scored); Khabra (penalty missed); Pradhan (penalty scored)

Nehru Stadium, Guwahati
