= Yusif Yakubu =

Ghanaian footballer (born 1976)

Personal information
- Date of birth: 4 September 1976 (age 50)
- Place of birth: Kumasi, Ghana
- Height: 1.83 m (6 ft 0 in)
- Position: Forward

Youth career
- 1997–1999: Hearts of Oak

Senior career*
Years	Team	Apps	(Gls)
1998–2000	Al Ahly		
2001–2005	Churchill Brothers	103	(65)
2005–2008	Mahindra United		(17)
2008–2010	East Bengal		(20)
2010–2011	Salgaocar		(15)
2011–2012	Prayag United		(12)
2012–2014	Mumbai	37	(18)
2016	East Bengal		
2017	Churchill Brothers	0	(0)
Total			(147)
- * Club domestic league appearances and goals

Yusif Yakubu (born 4 September 1976) is a Ghanaian former professional footballer who played as a forward. He scored a total of 148 I-League goals from 2000 to 2014, and is regarded as one of the best foreigners in history of football in India.

== Career ==
Yakubu was born in Kumasi, Ashanti Region, in 1976, and began his youth football career in Ghanaian side Hearts of Oak in 1997. He later moved to Egyptian Premier League side Al Ahly SC in 1998 and played until 2000, before settling in Indian clubs permanently.

Before joining Kingfisher East Bengal, he had played for the I-League clubs Churchill Brothers and Mahindra United. From 2001 to 2005, he scored 65 goals in 103 league matches with Churchill Brothers, finishing National Football League's top scorer twice. He scored his first NFC hat-trick with Churchill on 5 March 2004 against Indian Bank RC in a 4–1 win. In one season with Mahindra United, he won Federation Cup and NFL.

With East Bengal, Yakubu formed an impressive partnership with Bhaichung Bhutia, and scored nine goals in the 2008–09 I-League. He was part of the team's friendly matches of Myanmar tour, against Myanmar National League teams, in which they won two, drew one and lost one.

He is one of the all-time top scorer in Indian League and has scored 100 goals in the top tier of Indian football. On 26 May 2010, left East Bengal Club and signed for Salgaocar SC. From 2011 to 2012, he appeared with Prayag United and was in the squad that emerged as runners-up of 2012 IFA Shield. He is considered as one of the finest foreign football players in the history of Indian Club football.

In 2012, he moved to Mumbai FC and with the Mumbaikars, he scored his first hat-trick in I-League against Churchill Brothers in a 4–2 win on 13 April 2014. In the 2014–15 I-League season, they managed to acquire sixth position.

In January 2016, Yakubu moved to another Kolkata-based side Mohammedan Sporting.

On 7 August 2017, it was announced that Yakubu would return to India to sign for Churchill Brothers for their Goa Professional League campaign.

== Honours ==
Al Ahly

- Egyptian Premier League: 1999–2000

Churchill Brothers

- National Football League: 2001–02

Mahindra United

- National Football League: 2005–06
- Federation Cup (India): 2005
- Indian Super Cup: 2006

East Bengal

- Federation Cup: 2009–10, 2010
- Calcutta Football League: 2010

Salgaocar

- Federation Cup: 2011

Prayag United

- Durand Cup: runner-up 2011
- IFA Shield: runner-up 2012

Individual

- National Football League golden boot: 2001–02 (with 18 goals), 2002–03 (with 21 goals)
