= Fransa-Pax FC =

Former Indian professional association football club

Fransa-Pax
- Full name: Fransa-Pax Football Club
- Nickname(s): The Pax
- Founded: 2002
- Dissolved: 2006
- Ground: Fatorda Stadium
- Owner: Mickky Pacheco

Fransa-Pax Football Club was an Indian professional football club based in Nagoa, Goa. The club is best known for folding halfway through the 2005–06 Indian National Football League after its then owner Mickky Pacheco accused the All India Football Federation of trying to relegate the club. The club also competed in the Goa Professional League.

== History ==
Fransa Pax qualified for the 2004–05 Indian National Football League and finished in fifth place that season.

=== 2005–06: Final season ===
After finishing fifth in 2004–05, Fransa Pax was given the schedule for the 2005–06 Indian National Football League in which 7 of their final 8 games were away from home. The ownership group took this as a sign the All India Football Federation wanted them relegated. On 30 January 2006, Pax played a star-filled Mahindra United (who would also disband in 2008) who were then in first place and reigning Federation Cup champions. Mahindra won the match 2–1. After the match, Fransa coach Norbert Fernandes, along with goalkeeper Virender Singh and Ivan D’Silva, manhandled the referee Vikramjit Purakayastha after he awarded Mahindra two suspicious penalties. Fransa owner Mickky Pacheco ran after the match commissioner Enayetullah at the Fatorda Stadium. Also, around 2,000 Fransa fans vandalized the stadium.

After the game, Pacheco threatened to fold his team if justice was not served. On 3 February 2006, when Pax was to play Air India FC, the players did not take to the field. Due to pressure from Zee Sports, the AIFF canceled three games of Pax.

On 7 February 2006, the AIFF met to discuss the future of the club. They decided to reject Pacheco's claim. The AIFF agreed and set the replay date. Air India then went against this and, by FIFA rules, was awarded the 3 points. On 23 March 2006, Pax was dissolved as a football club.

== Honours ==
- National Football League II
  - Runners-up: 2003–04

== Notable player(s) ==
- (Rwanda) Louis Aniweta (2004–2006)

== See also ==
- Goans in football
- List of football clubs in India
