= Alvito D'Cunha =

Indian footballer

Personal information
- Full name: Alvito Ronaldo Correia D'Cunha
- Date of birth: 12 July 1978 (age 48)
- Place of birth: Sanvordem, Goa, India
- Height: 5 ft 8 in (1.73 m)
- Position: Left winger

Senior career*
Years	Team	Apps	(Gls)
1997–1998	Sesa	14	(6)
1998–2002	Salgaocar SC	59	(7)
2002–2016	East Bengal	159	(23)
Total		232	(36)

International career
2001–2006	India	20	(3)
- * Club domestic league appearances and goals as of 10 November 2016

Alvito Ronaldo Correia D'Cunha (born 12 July 1978, in Sanvordem) is a retired Indian football player. He was a former member of the India national team and represented India in the 2002 FIFA World Cup qualifiers. He spent most of his club career in East Bengal.

== Playing career ==
He played for East Bengal as a left winger for a long span of 14 seasons. He retired at the start of 2016 season as the club had not included D'Cunha in the squad. He previously played for two renowned Goan sides Salgaocar SC (1998–2002), and Sesa SC (1997–1998).

He made a start after a few years for East Bengal against Kalighat Milan Sangha in the inaugural match of the Calcutta Premier Division 2013, where he scored from a penalty on the 15th minute, and assisted his state-mate Joaquim Abranches with a forward through pass to score his first goal for the Kolkata-based side.

== Statistics ==
=== International ===
National team	Year	Apps	Goals
India	2001	4	0
India	2003	7	3
India	2004	5	0
India	2005	1	0
India	2006	2	0
India	Total	19	3

== Honours ==
Salgaocar

- National Football League: 1998–99
- Super Cup: 1999
- Rovers Cup: 1999
- Durand Cup: 1999
- Governor's Cup: 1999, 2001

East Bengal

- ASEAN Club Championship: 2003
- National Football League: 2002–03, 2003–04
- Federation Cup: 2007, 2009–10, 2010, 2012
- Super Cup: 2006, 2011
- IFA Shield: 2002, 2012
- Durand Cup: 2002, 2004
- Calcutta Premier Division: 2002, 2003, 2004, 2006, 2010, 2011, 2012, 2013.

India

- SAFF Championship: 2005; third place: 2003

Individual

- IndianFootball.com Awards —Player of the Year: 2003

Sporting positions
Preceded by Bhaichung Bhutia	East Bengal FC captain 2006–2007	Succeeded by Abhra Mondal
