= 2005–06 National Football League (India) =

10th season of National Football League

National Football League
- Season: 2005–06
- Dates: 10 January – 21 May 2006
- Champions: Mahindra United; 1st NFL title 1st Indian title
- Runner up: East Bengal
- Relegated: Salgaocar; Fransa-Pax
- AFC Cup: Mahindra United; Mohun Bagan
- Matches: 81
- Top goalscorer: Ranti Martins (13 goals)
- Biggest home win: Sporting Goa 3–0 Fransa-Pax (5 March 2006); Mohun Bagan 3–0 Salgaocar (23 March 2006); Dempo 3–0 JCT Mills; (31 March 2006); Sporting Goa 3–0 Mohammedan Sporting (8 April 2006); Dempo 4–1 Air India (9 April 2006)
- Biggest away win: Mohammedan Sporting 0–5 Mahindra United (5 May 2006)
- Highest scoring: East Bengal 5–3 Dempo (26 March 2006)

The 2005–06 National Football League, also known as the ONGC National Football League for sponsorship reasons, was the tenth season of the National Football League, the top Indian professional league for association football clubs, since its inception in 1996. It started on 10 January 2006 and concluded on 21 May.

East Bengal's Bhaichung Bhutia was named the best player of the league.

== Overview ==
It was contested by 10 teams, Mohammedan SC and Air India were promoted from NFL- 2. Mahindra United won the championship under the coach Derrick Pereira and this was their first title. East Bengal came second while Mohun Bagan came as third. Fransa Pax and Salgaocar were relegated from the National Football League 2006-07. Midway through the season, Fransa Pax withdrew their team from the league after 9 matches.

== League standings ==
Locations of teams in the 2005–06 National Football League

Pos	Team	Pld	W	D	L	GF	GA	GD	Pts	Qualification
1	Mahindra United	17	11	3	3	27	13	+14	36	Champions
2	East Bengal	17	9	4	4	25	16	+9	31	
3	Mohun Bagan	17	8	6	3	17	10	+7	30	
4	Sporting Goa	17	6	7	4	24	16	+8	25	
5	Dempo	17	6	7	4	29	22	+7	25	
6	JCT Mills	17	5	5	7	14	14	0	20	
7	Air India	17	5	4	8	16	22	−6	19	
8	Mohammedan Sporting	17	5	2	10	11	25	−14	17	
9	Salgaocar	17	2	6	9	15	29	−14	12	Relegated
10	Fransa Pax	9	0	4	5	2	13	−11	4	Relegated

Source: 10th National Football League

== Season statistics ==
=== Top scorers ===
Rank	Player	Club	Goals
1	(Nigeria) Ranti Martins	Dempo	13
2	(India) Bhaichung Bhutia	East Bengal	12
3	(Nigeria) Dudu Omagbemi	Sporting Goa	9
4	(Ghana) Yusif Yakubu	Mahindra United	8
5	(Nigeria) Chidi Edeh	Sporting Goa	7
6	(Brazil) José Ramirez Barreto	Mahindra United	6
7	(India) Bashiree Mohammed	Air India	4
7	(Brazil) Roberto Mendes Silva	Dempo	4
7	(India) Parveen Kumar	JCT	4
7	(India) Shanmugam Venkatesh	Mahindra United	4

=== Hat-tricks ===
Player	For	Against	Result	Date	Ref.
Ranti Martins	Dempo	Mahindra United	3–4 (H)	17 January 2006	
Bhaichung Bhutia	East Bengal	Sporting Clube	4–3 (H)	18 March 2006	
Dudu Omagbemi	Sporting Clube	Mohammedan Sporting	4–1 (H)	8 April 2006	

Note: (H) – Home; (A) – Away

== Season awards ==
The following awards were given at the conclusion of the season. East Bengal's Bhaichung Bhutia was voted the best player of the season by the coaches and captains of all participating teams of the season. JCT Mills received the fairplay award for receiving the lowest number of cards (8).

Award	Recipient	Club
Best Player	Bhaichung Bhutia	East Bengal
Best Midfielder	Shanmugam Venkatesh	Mahindra United
Best Goalkeeper	Sandip Nandy	Mahindra United
Best Defender	Mahesh Gawli	Mahindra United
Fair Play	JCT Mills	
