= 2002–03 East Bengal FC season =

Indian football club season

East Bengal
2002–03 season
- Chairman: Pranab Dasgupta
- Manager: Subhash Bhowmick
- Ground: Salt Lake Stadium
- National Football League: Champions
- Calcutta Football League: Champions
- Durand Cup: Champions
- IFA Shield: Champions
- Independence Day Cup: Champions

The 2002–03 season is East Bengal Football Club's 7th season in the National Football League, and also marks the club's 83rd season. Coached by Subhash Bhowmick, East Bengal won all five trophies from the five tournaments they participated in, including their second National league title, competing in the 2002–03 NFL. They also won the 2002 Calcutta Football League, 2002 Durand Cup and 2002 IFA Shield and the 2002 Independence Day Cup. This was the third instance in the history of East Bengal club that the club had won 5 trophies in a season, the other two back in 1972 and 1973 during P.K. Banerjee's reign.

== First-team squad ==
East Bengal FC squad for the 2002–03 season.
Note: Flags indicate national team as defined under FIFA eligibility rules; some limited exceptions apply. Players may hold more than one non-FIFA nationality.

No.	Pos.	Nation	Player
—	GK	IND	Sangram Mukherjee
—	GK	IND	Sandip Nandy
—	GK	IND	Satish Kumar
—	GK	IND	Arpan Dey.
—	DF	IND	Suley Musah
—	DF	IND	Surya Bikash Chakravarty
—	DF	IND	Amjad Ali Khan
—	DF	IND	Subhasis Roy Chaudhury
—	DF	IND	Deepak Mondal
—	DF	IND	M Suresh
—	DF	IND	Arun Malhotra
—	DF	IND	Raju Singh.
—	DF	IND	Anit Ghosh
—	MF	IND	Douglas De Silva
—	MF	IND	Malsawmtluanga

No.	Pos.	Nation	Player
—	MF	IND	S. Venkatesh
—	MF	IND	Chandan Das
—	MF	IND	Sashti Duley
—	MF	IND	Dipankar Roy
—	MF	IND	Tushar Rakshit
—	MF	IND	Sankarlal Chakraborty
—	MF	IND	Soumitra Chakravarty
—	MF	IND	Swarup Chatterjee.
—	MF	IND	Alvito D'Cunha
—	FW	IND	Mike Okoro
—	FW	IND	Gilmar Da Silva
—	FW	IND	Trijit Das
—	FW	IND	Kalia Kulothungan
—	FW	IND	Kaustav Ghosh

- Coach: (India) Subhash Bhowmick
- Team doctor: Dr. S R Dasgupta
- Team manager: Swapan Ball

== Stadiums ==
Kingfisher East Bengal F.C. have been using both the Salt Lake Stadium and the East Bengal Ground since Salt Lake Stadium opened in 1984. As of today the Salt Lake Stadium is used for East Bengal's I-League, AFC Cup, and Federation Cup games. The East Bengal Ground is used for the Calcutta Football League matches.

== Competitions ==
=== Overall ===
Competition	First match	Last match	Final Position
Calcutta Football League	3 August 2002	11 November 2002	Champions
National Football League	17 November 2002	28 April 2002	Champions
Durand Cup	4 January 2003	10 January 2003	Champions
IFA Shield	13 January 2003	22 January 2003	Champions
Independence Day Cup	27 September 2002	5 October 2002	Champions

== Matches ==
Win Draw Loss

=== National Football League ===
27 November 2002 1	East Bengal	1–0	JCT Mills	Kolkata
	Mike Okoro 59'			Stadium: East Bengal Ground

17 November 2002 2	East Bengal	2–0	Tollygunge Agragami	Kolkata
	Shanmugam Venkatesh 44'; Mike Okoro 58'			Stadium: East Bengal Ground

24 November 2002 3	East Bengal	1–0	Mahindra United	Kolkata
	Alvito D'Cunha 25'			Stadium: East Bengal Ground

8 December 2002 4	Mohun Bagan	0–2	East Bengal	Kolkata
			Subhashish Roy Chowdhury 70'; Alvito D'Cunha 90+'	Stadium: Salt Lake Stadium

12 December 2002 5	East Bengal	0–0	Churchill Brothers	Kolkata
				Stadium: East Bengal Ground

15 December 2002 6	East Bengal	2–1	Salgaocar Sports Club	Kolkata
	Gilmar 21', Mike Okoro 90+'		MacPherlin Dudu Omagbemi 68'	Stadium: East Bengal Ground

19 December 2002 7	Vasco Sports Club	1–1	East Bengal	Goa
	Marcos Pereira 72'		Alvito D'Cunha 33'

23 December 2002 8	Indian Bank	3–3	East Bengal	Chennai
	Kasun Nadika Jayasuriya 21', 22', 53'		Gilmar 51', Chandan Das 58', Shanmugam Venkatesh 59'

25 January 2003 9	Hindustan Aeronautics Ltd.	3–5	East Bengal	Bengaluru
	Kenneth Onu 81', 85', Mahendra Mani 90+'		Mike Okoro 4', 37'; Bhaichung Bhutia 32'; Suley Musah 70'; Alvito D'Cunha 89'

29 January 2003 10	Indian Telephone Industries	1–3	East Bengal	Bengaluru
	Ibrahim Karim Al Hasan 60'		Sasthi Duley 17'; Suley Musah 36'; Mike Okoro 83'

3 February 2003 11	East Bengal	3–2	Dempo Sports Club	Kolkata
	EB Channa (o.g.); Mike Okoro 54', 69'		Raman Vijayan 4'; EB Channa 14'

8 February 2003 12	East Bengal	4–1	Hindustan Aeronautics Ltd.	Kolkata
	Mike Okoro 21', 44', 75' , Suley Musah 38'		Kenneth Onu 77'	Stadium: East Bengal Ground

13 February 2003 13	Churchill Brothers SC	1–3	East Bengal	Goa
	Ratan Singh 35'		Douglas da Silva 27', Alvito D'Cunha 46', Mike Okoro 88'	Stadium: Fatorda Stadium

16 February 2003 14	Dempo Sports Club	2–2	East Bengal Club	Goa
	32' Jose Colaco 36' Mario Soares		18' Mike Okoro 20' Douglas da Silva

22 February 2003 15	East Bengal Club	1–0	Indian Telephone Industries	Kolkata
	11' Mike Okoro

25 February 2003 16	East Bengal Club	2–1	Mohun Bagan AC	Kolkata
	11' Alvito D'Cunha 73' Mike Okoro		54' Jose Barreto

1 March 2003 17	East Bengal Club	2–0	Tollygunge Agragami	Kolkata
	67' Douglas da Silva 89' Kalia Kulothungan

5 March 2003 18	JCT Mills	2–0	East Bengal Club	Ludhiana
	44' Jo Paul Ancheri 70' IM Vijayan

9 April 2003 19	Mahindra United	2–0	East Bengal Club	Mumbai
	33' Mongba Aby Samson 66' James Singh

13 April 2003 20	East Bengal Club	3–0	Indian Bank	Kolkata
	16' 85' Mike Okoro 53' Douglas da Silva

25 April 2003 21	East Bengal Club	4–0	Vasco Sports Club	Kolkata
	13' Douglas da Silva 47' Douglas da Silva 67' Malswam Tulunga Mike Okoro

28 April 2003 22	Salgaocar Sports Club	2–0	East Bengal Club	Goa
	22' Sebastiao Endro 54' Sunday Seah

=== Calcutta Football League ===
3 August 2002 1	East Bengal	2–0	Calcutta Port Trust	Kolkata
	Mike Okoro 30', 80'			Stadium: East Bengal Ground

6 August 2002 2	East Bengal	2–2	SAIL	Kolkata
	Mike Okoro 18'; Kalia Kulothungan 59'		Dulal Patra 76'; Lawrence Enyilord 78'	Stadium: East Bengal Ground

9 August 2002 3	East Bengal	2–0	Bharati Sangha	Kolkata
	Mike Okoro; Dipankar Roy			Stadium: East Bengal Ground

12 August 2002 4	East Bengal	5–1	Eastern Railway FC	Kolkata
	Mike Okoro 6', 70', 71'; Alvito D'Cunha 21'; Surya Bikash Chakraborty 57'		Somnath Pramanick	Stadium: East Bengal Ground

17 August 2002 5	East Bengal	3–0	FCI FC	Kolkata
	Alvito D'Cunha 20', 38'; Mike Okoro 71'			Stadium: East Bengal Ground

20 August 2002 6	East Bengal	2–1	Mohun Bagan	Kolkata
	Dipankar Roy; Shylo Malsawmtluanga 71'		Basudeb Mondal	Stadium: Salt Lake Stadium

24 August 2002 7	East Bengal	5–0	Everready Association	Kolkata
	Subhash Chakraborty 43', 58'; Chandan Das 46'; Shylo Malsawmtluanga 65'; Soumitra Chakraborty			Stadium: East Bengal Ground

27 August 2002 8	East Bengal	4–1	Tollygunge Agragami	Kolkata
	Alvito D'Cunha 49'; Mike Okoro 51'; Subhashish Roy Chowdhury 74'; Subhash Chakraborty 82'		Mehtab Hossain 75'	Stadium: East Bengal Ground

3 September 2002 9	East Bengal	2–0	Mohammedan Sporting	Kolkata
	Shylo Malsawmtluanga 12', 16'			Stadium: Salt Lake Stadium

7 September 2002 Championship Group	East Bengal	2–2	Tollygunge Agragami	Kolkata
	Subhash Chakraborty; Chandan Das		Sujoy Dutta; Ashim Biswas	Stadium: East Bengal Ground

12 September 2002 Championship Group	Mohammedan Sporting	3–3	East Bengal	Kolkata
	Reazul Mustafa; Syed Rahim Nabi (?)		Mike Okoro; Alvito D'Cunha; Shylo Malsawmtluanga	Stadium: Salt Lake Stadium

17 September 2002 Championship Group	East Bengal	0–1	Mohun Bagan	Kolkata
			Basudeb Mondal 41'	Stadium: Salt Lake Stadium

19 September 2002 Championship Group	East Bengal	3–0	Calcutta Port Trust	Kolkata
	Mike Okoro 24', 78'; Alvito D'Cunha 83'			Stadium: East Bengal Ground

11 November 2002 Championship final	East Bengal	3–0 (a.e.t.)	Mohammedan Sporting	Kolkata
	Douglas De Silva 2'; Sasthi Duley 45'; Shylo Malsawmtluanga			Stadium: Salt Lake Stadium

=== Independence Day Cup ===
East Bengal club went to Nagaon, Assam to participate in the 54th Independence Day Cup tournament after the end of the Championship Group round matches of the Calcutta League. The club won the tournament defeating Oil India FC of Assam by 2–0 with goals from Alvito D'Cunha and Chandan Das.

27 September 2002 Group stage	East Bengal	0–1	Oil India FC	Nagaon, Assam
			Tridip Khound 85'	Stadium: Nurul Amin Stadium

29 September 2002 Group stage	East Bengal	4–0	Gauhati Town Club	Nagaon, Assam
	Dipankar Roy 5'; Alvito D'Cunha 19'; Anit Ghosh 61'; Chandan Das 70'			Stadium: Nurul Amin Stadium

2 October 2002 Semi Final	East Bengal	2–0	Nagaland Police	Nagaon, Assam
	Mike Okoro 39'; Kalia Kulothungan 62'			Stadium: Nurul Amin Stadium

5 October 2002 Final	East Bengal	2–0	Oil India FC	Nagaon, Assam
	Alvito D'Cunha 42'; Chandan Das 82'			Stadium: Nurul Amin Stadium

=== Durand Cup ===
East Bengal club participated in the 115th Durand Cup held in Delhi being grouped in Group B along with MEG, Bangalore and Air India. The team won their third tournament of the season after defeating Army XI in the final by 3–0 margin.

4 January 2003 Group stage	East Bengal	4–0	Air India	Delhi
	Mike Okoro 33', 60'; Sashti Duley 38'; Osberne D'Souza 42' (o.g.)			Stadium: Ambedkar Stadium

4 January 2003 Group stage	East Bengal	0–1	MEG, Bangalore	Delhi
			Ajith Kumar 59'	Stadium: Ambedkar Stadium

8 January 2003 Semi Final	Salgaocar	0–1	East Bengal	Delhi
			Mike Okoro 79'	Stadium: Ambedkar Stadium

10 January 2003 Final	East Bengal	3–0	Army XI	Delhi
	Mike Okoro 67'; Kalia Kulothungan 72'; Douglas De Silva 77'			Stadium: Ambedkar Stadium

=== IFA Shield ===
Just days after winning the Durand Cup, the club participated in the IFA Shield held in Kolkata and was grouped alongside Indian Bank, Churchill Brothers and Tollygunge Agragami in Group A. The team reached the final defeating Vasco in the Semi-Final and lifted their 4th trophy of the season by defeating Churchill Brothers in the final via a penalty shootout, with Sashti Duley scoring the winning penalty in the sudden-death.

13 January 2003 Group stage	East Bengal	2–1	Indian Bank	Kolkata
	Tushar Rakshit 58'; Amjad Ali Khan 87'		Joseph 33'	Stadium: East Bengal Ground

15 January 2003 Group stage	East Bengal	0–1	Churchill Brothers	Kolkata
			Aqueel Ansari 83'	Stadium: Salt Lake Stadium

17 January 2003 Group stage	East Bengal	2–1	Tollygunge Agragami	Kolkata
	Trijit Das 31'; Suley Musah 70'		Manas Das 61'	Stadium: Salt Lake Stadium

19 January 2003 Semi Final	East Bengal	2–0	Vasco	Kolkata
	Suley Musah 18'; Jiten Rai 83'			Stadium: Salt Lake Stadium

22 January 2003 Final	East Bengal	0–0 (a.e.t.) (5–4 p)	Churchill Brothers	Kolkata
		Report		Stadium: Salt Lake Stadium; Referee: Bharat Mani
	Penalties
	Suley Musah (penalty missed); Chandan Das (penalty scored); Kalia Kulothungan (penalty scored); Kaustav Ghosh (penalty scored); Douglas De Silva (penalty scored); Sashti Duley (penalty scored)		(penalty scored) Kasif Jamal; (penalty scored) Rajesh Meetei; (penalty scored) Noel Wilson; (penalty scored) Yusif Yakubu; (penalty missed) Roque Barreto; (penalty missed) Tiken Singh

== Sponsors ==
- Main Sponsor: Kingfisher (Parent Company United Breweries Group is 50% stake holder in the club).
