= 2003–04 East Bengal FC season =

Indian football club season

East Bengal
2003–04 season
- Chairman: Dr Pranab Dasgupta
- Manager: Subhash Bhowmick
- Ground: Salt Lake Stadium
- National Football League: Champions
- Calcutta Football League: Champions
- Federation Cup: Quarter-finals
- Super Cup: Runners-up
- ASEAN Cup: Champions
- Durand Cup: Runners-up
- IFA Shield: Runners-up

The 2003–04 season was East Bengal Football Club's 8th season in the National Football League, and also marked the club's 84th season. East Bengal successfully defended their league title from the previous season, competing in the 2003-04 NFL. They have also won the 2003 Calcutta Football League and the 2003 ASEAN Club Championship. They became runners-up in the 2003 Super Cup, 2003 Durand Cup and 2003 IFA Shield.

== First-team squad ==
East Bengal FC squad for the 2003–04 season.
Note: Flags indicate national team as defined under FIFA eligibility rules; some limited exceptions apply. Players may hold more than one non-FIFA nationality.

No.	Pos.	Nation	Player
1	GK	IND	Sangram Mukherjee
2	DF	IND	M Suresh
3	DF	IND	Deepak Mondal
4	DF	IND	Mahesh Gawli
5	MF	IND	Malsawmtluanga
6	MF	IND	Kulothungan
8	MF	IND	Sasthi Duley
9	MF	IND	Alvito D'Cunha
10	FW	NGR	Mike Okoro
11	FW	IND	Bijen Singh
12	FW	IND	Bhaichung Bhutia
13	GK	IND	Sandip Nandy
14	MF	IND	Chandan Das
15	MF	BRA	Douglas Silva

No.	Pos.	Nation	Player
16	DF	IND	Debjit Ghosh
17	DF	IND	Surkumar Singh (c)
18	MF	IND	Subhash Chakraborty
19	FW	IND	Raman Vijayan
22	DF	NGR	Suley Musah
26	FW	BRA	Cristiano Júnior
—	GK	IND	Arpan Dey
—	GK	IND	Jitu Chhetri
—	DF	IND	Surya Bikash Chakraborty
—	DF	IND	Subhashish Roy Choudhury
—	DF	IND	Anit Ghosh
—	MF	IND	Dipankar Roy
—	MF	IND	Sujoy Dutta
—	MF	IND	Arunava Sarkar
—	MF	IND	Tushar Rakshit

- Coach: (India) Subhash Bhowmick
- Physical trainer: (South Africa) Kevin Jackson
- Team doctor: Dr. S R Dasgupta
- Team manager: Swapan Ball

== Stadiums ==
Kingfisher East Bengal F.C. have been using both the Salt Lake Stadium and the East Bengal Ground sense Salt Lake Stadium opened in 1984. As of today the Salt Lake Stadium is used for East Bengal's I-League, AFC Cup, and Federation Cup games. The East Bengal Ground is used for the Calcutta Football League matches.

== Competitions ==
=== Overall ===
Competition	First match	Last match	Final Position
Calcutta Football League	20 June 2003	2 November 2003	Champions
ASEAN Cup	14 July 2003	26 July 2003	Champions
Federation Cup	31 July 2003	4 August 2003	Quarter Finals
IFA Shield	20 September 2003	28 September 2003	Runners-up
Durand Cup	4 November 2003	10 November 2003	Runners-up
Super Cup	14 November 2003		Runners-up
National Football League	30 November 2003	12 May 2004	Champions

== Matches ==
Win Draw Loss

=== Calcutta Football League ===
20 June 2003 1	East Bengal	4–1	Eastern Railway F.C.	Kolkata
	Surkumar Singh 1', 81'; Debjit Ghosh 38'; Bhaichung Bhutia 41'		Henry Odogo 62'	Stadium: East Bengal Ground

23 June 2003 2	East Bengal	3–0	West Bengal Police	Kolkata
	Bhaichung Bhutia 15'; Alvito D'Cunha 35', 89'			Stadium: East Bengal Ground

30 June 2003 3	East Bengal	3–0	Wari AC	Kolkata
	Suley Musah 52', 68', 80'			Stadium: East Bengal Ground

2 July 2003 4	East Bengal	3–0	Mohammedan AC	Kolkata
	Bhaichung Bhutia 42', 71'; Alvito D'Cunha 77'			Stadium: East Bengal Ground

5 July 2003 5	East Bengal	3–0	Mohun Bagan	Kolkata
	Suley Musah 23'; Bhaichung Bhutia 68', 83'			Stadium: Salt Lake Stadium

11 August 2003 6	East Bengal	2–1	Everready Association	Kolkata
	Douglas De Silva 37'; Bhaichung Bhutia 70'		Ernest Jeremiah 47'	Stadium: East Bengal Ground

16 August 2003 7	East Bengal	2–0	Tollygunge Agragami	Kolkata
	Bhaichung Bhutia 78', 79'			Stadium: East Bengal Ground

19 August 2003 8	East Bengal	5–0	Bharati Sangha	Kolkata
	Mike Okoro 9', 71'; Suley Musah 30', 40'; Malsawmtluanga 60'			Stadium: East Bengal Ground

23 August 2003 9	East Bengal	4–1	Mohammedan Sporting	Kolkata
	Mike Okoro 36', 40'; Bijen Singh 67'; Surkumar Singh 86'		Dipendu Biswas 83'	Stadium: Salt Lake Stadium

25 August 2003 10	East Bengal	4–0	Railway F.C.	Kolkata
	Mike Okoro 3', 13', 22'; Malsawmtluanga 29'			Stadium: East Bengal Ground

28 August 2003 11	East Bengal	3–0	Calcutta Port Trust	Kolkata
	Suley Musah; Mike Okoro 45'; Kulothungan			Stadium: East Bengal Ground

4 September 2003 Championship Group	East Bengal	0–0	Mohun Bagan	Kolkata
				Stadium: Salt Lake Stadium

7 September 2003 Championship Group	East Bengal	1–2	Mohammedan Sporting	Kolkata
	Mike Okoro 51'		Sheikh Sanjib 49'; Abdul Rauf Khan 87'	Stadium: Salt Lake Stadium

10 September 2003 Championship Group	East Bengal	2–2	Everready Association	Kolkata
	Suley Musah 40'; Mike Okoro 85'		Eugene Gray 44'; Ernest Jeremiah 88'	Stadium: Salt Lake Stadium

13 September 2003 Championship Group	East Bengal	2–0	Mohammedan A.C.	Kolkata
	Bijen Singh 51'; Sashti Duley 86'			Stadium: East Bengal Ground

16 September 2003 Championship Group	East Bengal	2–1	Tollygunge Agragami	Kolkata
	Kulothungan 37'; Raman Vijayan 66'		Manik Barman 73'	Stadium: East Bengal Ground

2 November 2003 Championship final	East Bengal	1–1 (a.e.t.) (5–4 p)	Mohun Bagan	Kolkata
	Suley Musah 60'		Ashim Biswas 23'	Stadium: Salt Lake Stadium

=== ASEAN Club Championship ===
The ASEAN Club Championship is an international club football competition between domestic champion clubs sides run by the ASEAN Football Federation. Formerly known as the LG Cup, sponsored by LG Electronics. LG described the competition as a "social marketing experiment". Qualification to the competition was for champions clubs from AFF-affiliated countries only, plus the champions from India in 2003. After winning the 2002–03 National Football League, East Bengal was invited to the inaugural 2003 ASEAN Club Championship held at Jakarta, Indonesia. Top clubs from South-East Asia participated in the tournament which included the favourites BEC Tero Sasana from Thailand who already reached the 2002–03 AFC Champions League Finals. The star-studded team consisted of Golden Ball winner of 2002–03 AFC Champions League: Therdsak Chaiman. Other top teams like 2002 Malaysia Super League Champions Perak FC and Liga Indonesia 2002 Champions Petrokimia Putra participated in the tournament.

East Bengal was grouped alongside BEC Tero Sasana and Philippine Army in Group D. They lost the first match against the favourites BEC Tero Sasana 1–0, courtesy of a solitary goal from Therdsak Chaiman. The Red and Gold brigade bounced back in style as they defeated the Philippine Army 6–0, with Bhaichung Bhutia scoring all 6 goals, becoming the only Indian player to score a double hattrick in an International game to date. In the Quarter Finals, East Bengal faced Persita Tangerang of Indonesia. Goals from Bhaichung and Bijen Singh ensured a 2–1 win for the Kolkata side. Bhaichung was again on the scoresheet when East Bengal faced Petrokimia Putra in the Semi-Final. The score was 1–1 after 120 minutes and the Red and Golds won 7–6 in the shootout. On 26 July 2003, East Bengal made history as they defeated the favourites BEC Tero Sasana 3–1 with goals from Mike Okoro, Bhaichung and Alvito D'Cunha, hence becoming the first Indian club to win a top-level officially recognised tournament in foreign soil. Bhaichung became the top scorer of the tournament with nine goals. Sandip Nandy was adjudged as the Best Goalkeeper of the Tournament.

==== Group stage ====
Team	Pld	W	D	L	GF	GA	GD	Pts
(Thailand) BEC Tero Sasana	2	2	0	0	4	0	+4	6
(India) East Bengal	2	1	0	1	6	1	+5	3
(Philippines) Philippine Army	2	0	0	2	0	9	−9	0

Source: RSSSF

=== Bracket ===
Quarter-Finals
20 July
(Indonesia) Petrokimia Putra (a.e.t.)	3
Singapore AF	2
21 July
(Indonesia) Persita Tangerang	1
(India) East Bengal	2
20 July 2003
(Malaysia) Perak	2
(Cambodia) Samart United	0
21 July
(Thailand) BEC Tero Sasana	2
(Vietnam) Hoàng Anh Gia Lai	1

Semi-Finals
24 July
(Indonesia) Petrokimia Putra	1 (6)
(India) East Bengal (p)	1 (7)
24 July
(Malaysia) Perak	1
(Thailand) BEC Tero Sasana	3

Final
26 July
(India) East Bengal	3
(Thailand) BEC Tero Sasana	1
Third place
26 July
(Indonesia) Petrokimia Putra	3
(Malaysia) Perak	0

===== Matches =====
Win Draw Loss

14 July 2003 Group stage	BEC Tero Sasana (Thailand)	1–0	(India) East Bengal	Jakarta, Indonesia
	Therdsak Chaiman 85'			Stadium: Gelora Bung Karno Stadium

16 July 2003 Group stage	East Bengal (India)	6–0	(Philippines) Philippine Army	Jakarta, Indonesia
	Baichung Bhutia 20' (pen.), 50', 53', 70', 75', 88'			Stadium: Gelora Bung Karno Stadium

21 July 2003 Quarter-final	Persita Tangerang (Indonesia)	1–2	(India) East Bengal	Jakarta, Indonesia
	Ilham Jayakesuma 62'		Baichung Bhutia 53'; Bijen Singh 76'	Stadium: Gelora Bung Karno Stadium

24 July 2003 Semi-final	Petrokimia Putra (Indonesia)	1–1 (a.e.t.) (6–7 p)	(India) East Bengal	Jakarta, Indonesia
	Jaenal Ichwan 23'	Report	Baichung Bhutia 58'	Stadium: Gelora Bung Karno Stadium
	Penalties
	Jaenal Ichwan (penalty scored); Indraju (penalty scored); Pdudu Putra (penalty scored); Daniel Fernando (penalty scored); Sasi Kirono (penalty missed); Chan Jhe (penalty scored); Ekwe (penalty scored); Loko (penalty missed)		(penalty scored) Baichung Bhutia; (penalty scored) Bijen Singh; (penalty scored) Suley Musah; (penalty missed) Shylo Malsawmtluanga; (penalty scored) Chandan Das; (penalty scored) Douglas da Silva; (penalty scored) Surkumar Singh; (penalty scored) Muttah Suresh

26 July 2003 Final	East Bengal (India)	3–1	(Thailand) BEC Tero Sasana	Jakarta, Indonesia
	Mike Okoro 20'; Baichung Bhutia 46'; Alvito D'Cunha 69'		Panai Kongprapun 58'	Stadium: Gelora Bung Karno Stadium; Referee: Jimmy Napitupulu (Indonesia)

=== Federation Cup ===
31 July 2003 Round of 16	East Bengal	5–0	HAL	Kolkata
	Bijen Singh 4', 31'; Chandan Das 58', 83'; Dipankar Roy 68'			Stadium: Salt Lake Stadium

4 August 2003 Quarter Final	East Bengal	0–1	Vasco S.C.	Kolkata
			Sushanth Mathew 85'	Stadium: Salt Lake Stadium

=== IFA Shield ===
20 September 2003 Group stage	East Bengal	1–0	Eastern Railway F.C.	Siliguri
	Bijen Singh 8'			Stadium: Kanchenjunga Stadium

22 September 2003 Group stage	East Bengal	9–0	Wari AC	Siliguri
	Dipankar Roy 9', 26', 35', 42'; Bijen Singh 21', 40'; Kulothungan 46'; Douglas De Silva 75'; Malsawmtluanga 81'			Stadium: Kanchenjunga Stadium

26 September 2003 Semi Final	East Bengal	2–0	Everready Association	Kolkata
	Douglas De Silva 29'; Dipankar Roy 55'			Stadium: Salt Lake Stadium

28 September 2003 Final	East Bengal	0–0 (a.e.t.) (3–5 p)	Mohun Bagan	Kolkata
				Stadium: Salt Lake Stadium
	Penalties
	Suley Musah (penalty scored); Bijen Singh (penalty scored); Surkumar Singh (penalty scored); Muttah Suresh (penalty missed)		(penalty scored) José Ramirez Barreto; (penalty scored) Palash Karmakar; (penalty scored) Mehtab Hossain; (penalty scored) Sunil Chhetri; (penalty scored) Lolendra Singh

=== Durand Cup ===
4 November 2003 Group stage	East Bengal	3–2	Indian Bank	Delhi
	Bhaichung Bhutia 16', 49'; Mike Okoro 80'		Mahendra Mani 2'; Syed Shabir Pasha 84'	Stadium: Ambedkar Stadium

6 November 2003 Group stage	East Bengal	3–0	Dempo	Delhi
	Mike Okoro 51'; Malsawmtluanga 82'; Kulothungan 90'			Stadium: Ambedkar Stadium

8 November 2003 Semi Final	East Bengal	3–0	Air India	Delhi
	Malsawmtluanga 22'; Chandan Das 36'; Mike Okoro 59'			Stadium: Ambedkar Stadium

10 November 2003 Final	East Bengal	1–1 (a.e.t.) (4–5 p)	Salgaocar	Delhi
	Mahesh Gawli 62'		Tomba Singh 59'	Stadium: Ambedkar Stadium
	Penalties
	Suley Musah (penalty scored); Chandan Das (penalty scored); Malsawmtluanga (penalty scored); Bhaichung Bhutia (penalty missed); Mike Okoro (penalty missed)		(penalty scored) Climax Lawrence; (penalty scored) Tomba Singh; (penalty scored) Dharamjit Singh; (penalty missed) Jatin Bisht; (penalty scored) Bello Razaq

=== Super Cup ===
14 November 2003 Super Cup	East Bengal	1–1 (a.e.t.) (3–4 p)	Mahindra United	Kolkata
	Suley Musah 19'		Felix Aboagye 45'	Stadium: Salt Lake Stadium
	Penalties
	Suley Musah (penalty scored); Kulothungan (penalty scored); Chandan Das (penalty scored); Malsawmtluanga (penalty missed); Sujoy Dutta (penalty missed)		(penalty scored) Odartey Lawson; (penalty scored) Khalid Jamil; (penalty scored) Jules Alberto; (penalty scored) Abhishek Yadav

=== National Football League ===
30 November 2003 1	Salgaocar	2–1	East Bengal	Goa
	Felix Ibrebru 24'; Micky Fernandes 29'		Douglas De Silva 38'	Stadium: Fatorda Stadium

4 December 2003 2	Vasco	1–1	East Bengal	Goa
	Amaechi 82'		Dipankar Roy 83'	Stadium: Fatorda Stadium

9 December 2003 3	JCT Mills	0–0	East Bengal	Ludhiana
				Stadium: Guru Nanak Stadium

16 December 2003 4	East Bengal	2–1	Churchill Brothers	Kolkata
	Cristiano Júnior 45'; Bhaichung Bhutia 90'		Yusif Yakubu 4'	Stadium: Salt Lake Stadium

20 December 2003 5	East Bengal	1–0	Tollygunge Agragami	Kolkata
	Cristiano Júnior 1'			Stadium: Salt Lake Stadium

27 December 2003 6	Dempo	3–2	East Bengal	Goa
	Stanley Colaco 8'; Sunday Seah 25'; Nacimento Silveira 75'		Cristiano Júnior 1'; Bhaichung Bhutia 7'	Stadium: Fatorda Stadium

31 December 2003 7	Mahindra United	0–1	East Bengal	Mumbai
			Cristiano Júnior 68'	Stadium: Cooperage Ground

8 January 2004 8	East Bengal	2–0	Sporting Clube de Goa	Kolkata
	Bhaichung Bhutia 38'; Cristiano Júnior 73'			Stadium: Salt Lake Stadium

12 January 2004 9	Indian Bank	1–1	East Bengal	Chennai
	Kamaldeen Fuard 25'		Cristiano Júnior 22'	Stadium: JL Nehru Stadium

16 January 2004 10	East Bengal	4–0	Mohammedan Sporting	Kolkata
	Alvito D'Cunha 45'; Bhaichung Bhutia 70'; Cristiano Júnior 75'; Mike Okoro 89'			Stadium: Salt Lake Stadium

22 January 2004 11	East Bengal	2–1	Mohun Bagan	Kolkata
	Dipankar Roy 23'; Mike Okoro 75'		Ashim Biswas 41'	Stadium: Salt Lake Stadium

29 February 2004 12	East Bengal	3–1	Salgaocar	Kolkata
	Bhaichung Bhutia 5', 45'; Subhash Chakraborty 53'		Bello Razaq 40'	Stadium: Salt Lake Stadium

5 March 2004 13	East Bengal	2–0	Mahindra United	Kolkata
	Cristiano Júnior 35'; Bhaichung Bhutia 87'			Stadium: Salt Lake Stadium

11 March 2004 14	East Bengal	1–0	Vasco	Kolkata
	Cristiano Júnior 43'			Stadium: Salt Lake Stadium

15 March 2004 15	East Bengal	0–0	Dempo	Kolkata
				Stadium: Salt Lake Stadium

19 March 2004 16	East Bengal	3–0	JCT Mills	Kolkata
	Bhaichung Bhutia 45+1'; Mike Okoro 51'; Cristiano Júnior 60'			Stadium: Salt Lake Stadium

12 April 2004 17	Tollygunge Agragami	0–1	East Bengal	Kolkata
			Bhaichung Bhutia	Stadium: Salt Lake Stadium

15 April 2004 18	Mohammedan Sporting	0–3	East Bengal	Kolkata
			Cristiano Júnior 59', 62'; Bhaichung Bhutia 65'	Stadium: Salt Lake Stadium

25 April 2004 19	Mohun Bagan	1–2	East Bengal	Kolkata
	Ashim Biswas 16'		Bhaichung Bhutia 53'; Cristiano Júnior 60'	Stadium: Salt Lake Stadium

28 April 2004 20	East Bengal	3–0	Indian Bank	Kolkata
	Bhaichung Bhutia 19'; Douglas De Silva 73'; Dipankar Roy 83'			Stadium: Salt Lake Stadium

9 May 2004 21	Churchill Brothers	1–0	East Bengal	Goa
	Santa Singh 75'			Stadium: Fatorda Stadium

12 May 2004 22	Sporting Clube de Goa	1–2	East Bengal	Goa
	Adbullatif Seriki 84'		Cristiano Júnior 46', 60'	Stadium: Fatorda Stadium

== Statistics ==
=== Top Scorers ===
Goal Scorers for East Bengal FC in 2003–04 season
Rank	No.	Pos.	Nat.	Name	CFL	ASEAN	Fed Cup	IFA Shield	Durand Cup	Super Cup	NFL	Total
1	12	FW	(India)	Bhaichung Bhutia	9	9	0	0	2	0	12	32
2	10	FW	(Nigeria)	Mike Okoro	10	1	0	0	3	0	3	17
3	26	FW	(Brazil)	Cristiano Júnior	—	—	—	—	—	—	15	15
4	22	DF	(Ghana)	Suley Musah	9	0	0	0	0	1	0	10
5	6	MF	(India)	Dipankar Roy	0	0	1	5	0	0	2	8
6	11	FW	(India)	Bijen Singh	2	1	2	3	0	0	0	6
7	9	MF	(India)	Alvito D'Cunha	3	1	0	0	0	0	1	5
7	15	MF	(Brazil)	Douglas De Silva	1	0	0	2	0	0	2	5
7	5	MF	(India)	Shylo Malsawmtluanga	2	0	0	1	2	0	0	5
				Own Goals	0	0	0	0	0	0	0	0

== Sponsors ==
- Main Sponsor: Kingfisher (Parent Company United Breweries Group is 50% stake holder in the club).
