= List of East Bengal FC seasons =

East Bengal is an Indian association football club based in Kolkata, West Bengal, which competes in the Indian Super League, the top tier of Indian football. The club was formed when the vice-president of the Jorabagan Club, Suresh Chandra Chaudhuri, resigned. He did so when Jorabagan sent out their starting eleven but with the notable exclusion of defender Sailesh Bose. He was dropped from the squad for unknown reasons when they were about to face Mohun Bagan in the Coochbehar Cup Semi Final on 28 July 1920. He and Raja Manmatha Nath Chaudhuri, Ramesh Chandra Sen, and Aurobinda Ghosh, formed East Bengal, in Jorabagan, Suresh Chandra's home on 1 August 1920. East Bengal started playing in the IFA 2nd division (now the Calcutta Football League) from 1921. In 1925, they qualified for the first division for the first time. Since then, they have won numerous Indian Football titles.

East Bengal joined the National Football League at its inception in 1996 and is the only club to play every season to date, even after its name changed to the I-League in 2007. East Bengal have won the National Football League thrice: 2000–01, 2002–03 and 2003–04 and were runners up seven times, more than any Indian football club. Among other trophies, East Bengal have won the Calcutta Football League 39 times, IFA Shield 28 times, Federation Cup eight times and the Durand Cup 16 times.

On 27 September 2020, the inclusion of East Bengal FC into the 2020–21 Indian Super League was officially announced.

== Key ==
The symbols and colours used below:

- P = Played
- W = Games won
- D = Games drawn
- L = Games lost
- F = Goals for
- A = Goals against
- Pts. = Points
- Pos. = Final position
- NFL = National Football League
- IL = I-League
- ISL = Indian Super League
- F = Final
- Group = Group stage
- R16 = Round of 16
- QF = Quarter-finals
- DNQ = Did not qualify
- Em-dash (—) = East Bengal did not participate
- R1 = Round 1
- R2 = Round 2
- R3 = Round 3
- R4 = Round 4
- R5 = Round 5
- R6 = Round 6
- SF = Semi-finals

- 1st or W = Winners
- 2nd or RU = Runners-up
- 3rd or 2nd RU = Third place
- ↑ = Promoted
- ↓ = Relegated
- * = Top scorer in division

== National League seasons ==
The National Football League started in the year 1996 as the first football league in India to be organized on a national scale. East Bengal participated in the league from its inaugural season, and has been the only football team in India to have participated in all editions of the nation's premier league until 2020, when the Indian Super League was announced as the Premier football competition in India. The club has won the National League thrice (2000–01, 2002–03 and 2003–04) and has finished as runner-up on seven occasions. Along with the National League, the club has also won the Federation Cup, the premier cup tournament in India eight times. East Bengal moved from the I-League to the Indian Super League as the eleventh team in the 2020–21 season when ISL was given the highest level league status in the Indian football system. In their inaugural season in the ISL, East Bengal finished in ninth place. In the 2021–22, East Bengal finished at the bottom of the table in the eleventh position, winning just one out of the twenty matches in the league.

As of 20 November 2026

Results of league and cup competitions by season
Season	League										Domestic Cup (Note: Federation Cup was the primary Domestic Cup until 2016-17. Continued as Super Cup from 2017-18.)	Super Cup (Note: Indian Super Cup (1997-2011) was the annual match contested between the champions of the previous I-League season and the holders of the Federation Cup, usually held at a neutral venue. Abolished in 2011.)	Continental		Top goalscorer	
Season	Div	Pld	W	D	L	GF	GA	Pts	Pos	Playoffs	Domestic Cup	Super Cup	AFC	Pos	Name	Goals
1996–97	NFL	19	10	6	3	25	13	36	3rd	—	W	—	—	—	(India) Raman Vijayan	9
1997–98	NFL	18	8	7	3	18	10	31	2nd	—	RU	W	Asian CWC	R2	(India) Bhaichung Bhutia	8
1998–99	NFL	20	13	6	1	33	10	45	2nd	—	RU	—	Asian Cup	R1	(India) Raman Vijayan	10
1999–00	NFL	22	8	8	6	25	21	32	7th	—	Not held	—	—	—	(Ghana) Willie Brown (Brazil) Ossius Luiz Ferreira (India) Dipankar Roy	4
2000–01	NFL	22	13	7	2	30	9	46	1st	—	Not held	—	—	—	(Nigeria) Omolaja Olalekan	8
2001–02	NFL	22	11	3	8	31	23	36	5th	—	R–16	—	—	—	(Nigeria) Omolaja Olalekan	7
2002–03	NFL	22	15	4	3	44	22	49	1st	—	Not held	—	—	—	(Nigeria) Mike Okoro	17
2003–04	NFL	22	15	4	3	37	13	49	1st	—	QF	RU	AFC Cup	QF	(Brazil) Cristiano Júnior	15
2004–05	NFL	22	13	4	5	34	16	43	3rd	—	QF	—	AFC Cup	Group	(India) Bhaichung Bhutia	9
2005–06	NFL	17	9	4	4	25	16	31	2nd	—	QF	—	—	—	(India) Bhaichung Bhutia	12
2006–07	NFL	18	7	5	6	29	29	26	5th	—	QF	W	—	—	(Brazil) Edmilson	13
2007–08	IL	18	5	4	9	17	23	19	6th	—	W	—	AFC Cup	Group	(Brazil) Edmilson	8
2008–09	IL	22	7	7	8	31	26	28	6th	—	SF	RU	—	—	(Ghana) Yusif Yakubu	11
2009–10	IL	26	7	10	9	27	31	31	9th	—	W	—	AFC Cup	Group	(Ghana) Yusif Yakubu	9
2010–11	IL	26	15	6	5	44	21	51	2nd	—	W	RU	AFC Cup	Group	(Australia) Tolgay Özbey	17
2011–12	IL	26	15	6	5	46	22	51	2nd	—	RU	W	AFC Cup	Group	(Australia) Tolgay Özbey	18
2012–13	IL	26	13	8	5	44	18	47	3rd	—	W	—	AFC Cup	SF	(Nigeria) Chidi Edeh	18
2013–14	IL	24	12	7	5	39	23	43	2nd	—	Group	—	—	—	(Nigeria) Chidi Edeh	9
2014–15	IL	20	8	5	7	30	28	29	4th	—	Group	—	AFC Cup	Group	(Nigeria) Ranti Martins	17
2015–16	IL	16	7	4	5	22	18	25	3rd	—	QF	—	—	—	(Nigeria) Ranti Martins	12
2016–17	IL	18	10	3	5	33	15	33	3rd	—	SF	—	—	—	(Trinidad and Tobago) Willis Plaza	9
2017–18	IL	18	8	7	3	32	19	33	4th	—	RU	—	—	—	(Nigeria) Dudu Omagbemi	8
2018–19	IL	20	13	3	4	37	20	42	2nd	—	R-16 (Note: Walkover given by East Bengal due to protest citing unfair treatment to I-League clubs along with six other clubs.)	—	—	—	(India) Jobby Justin (Mexico) Enrique Esqueda	9
2019–20	IL	16	6	5	5	22	18	20	2nd (Note: The 2019-20 I-League was cancelled after 16 Rounds due to the COVID-19 pandemic. East Bengal FC was at the second place when the league was cancelled.)	—	Not held	—	—	—	(Spain) Marcos Espada (Spain) Jaime Santos	6
2020–21	ISL	20	3	8	9	22	33	17	9th	DNQ	Not held	—	—	—	(Germany) Matti Steinmann	4
2021–22	ISL	20	1	8	11	18	36	11	11th	DNQ	Not held	—	—	—	(Croatia) Antonio Perošević	4
2022–23	ISL	20	6	1	13	22	38	19	9th	DNQ	Group	—	—	—	(Brazil) Cleiton Silva	12
2023–24	ISL	22	6	6	10	27	29	24	9th	DNQ	W	—	—	—	(Brazil) Cleiton Silva	8
2024–25	ISL	24	8	4	12	27	33	28	9th	DNQ	R–16	—	AFC CL 2 AFCGL	PR; QF	(India) P. V. Vishnu (India) David Lalhlansanga (Greece) Dimitrios Diamantakos	4
2025–26	ISL	13	7	5	1	30	11	26	1st	—	RU	—	—	—	(Spain) Youssef Ezzejjari	11
2026–27	ISL	4	2	1	1	14	8	7	TBD	—	TBD	—	AFC CL 2	Group	(Ivory Coast) Aké Arnaud Loba	4

== Calcutta Football League seasons ==
East Bengal Club was included in the Calcutta Football League second division in 1921 after the Tajhat Club was disbanded and had withdrawn its name following the 1920 season. The club gained promotion to the first division for the first time in 1925 after finishing joint champions with the Cameroon's B team. The club was relegated back into the second division only once, in 1928, and regained their promotion in 1931 into the first division; the team has been in the division ever since. The club won its first Calcutta Football league title in 1942 and has won it 41 times, the most ever in the tournament's history to date. The club also holds the record for winning the most consecutive titles—eight: (2010–2017).

As of 19 September 2026

East Bengal in Calcutta Football League
Season	Division	P	W	D	L	Pts	Pos	Top goalscorer	Goals
1920	—	—	—	—	—	—	—	—	—
1921	2nd Div	24	11	12	1	34	3rd	(British Raj) Arabinda Ghosh	8
1922	2nd Div	22	13	3	6	29	4th	(British Raj) R Dutta (British Raj) Ramesh Chandra Sen	9
1923	2nd Div	24	8	5	11	21	10th	(British Raj) Mona Dutta	5
1924	2nd Div	24	16	5	3	37	1st ↑ (Note: Joint Champions with Cameroons B, however, since Cameroons A were already in 1st Div, East Bengal was promoted instead.)	(British Raj) Mona Dutta	11
1925	1st Div	16	8	3	5	19	4th	(British Raj) Mona Dutta	9
1926	1st Div	16	5	3	8	13	6th	(British Raj) Jatin Sarkar	5
1927	1st Div	18	4	6	8	14	6th	(British Raj) Jatin Sarkar (British Raj) Surjo Chakraborty	5
1928	1st Div	18	2	5	11	9	10th ↓	(British Raj) Mona Dutta	6
1929	2nd Div	22	11	7	4	29	2nd	(British Raj) Surjo Chakraborty	15
1930	2nd Div	8	8	0	0	16	Withdrew (Note: The Indian teams forfeited due to the Satyagraha movement, as a symbol of solidarity to the Indian independence movement.)	(British Raj) Surjo Chakraborty	9
1931	2nd Div	22	17	3	2	37	1st ↑	(British Raj) Surjo Chakraborty	15
1932	1st Div	18	12	2	4	26	2nd	(British Raj) Surjo Chakraborty (British Raj) Majid	9
1933	1st Div	20	8	9	3	25	2nd	(British Raj) Majid	9
1934	1st Div	20	5	8	7	18	8th	(British Raj) Majid	6
1935	1st Div	22	11	7	4	29	2nd	(British Raj) Ramana	8
1936	1st Div	22	7	6	9	22	8th	(British Raj) Laxminarayan	9
1937	1st Div	22	12	4	6	28	2nd	(British Raj) Murgesh	16
1938	1st Div	22	8	9	5	25	4th	(British Raj) Murgesh	7
1939	1st Div	19	8	8	3	24	Withdrew (Note: Both East Bengal and Mohammedan Sporting had a falling-out with IFA and they boycotted the league midway.)	(British Raj) Laxminarayan	5
1940	1st Div	24	10	10	4	30	4th	(British Raj) A.C. Somana	9
1941	1st Div	26	18	4	4	40	2nd	(British Raj) A.C. Somana	24
1942	1st Div	24	20	3	1	43	1st	(British Raj) A.C. Somana	26
1943	1st Div	24	16	5	3	37	2nd	(British Raj) A.C. Somana	19
1944	1st Div	24	14	6	4	34	3rd	(British Raj) Sunil Ghosh	13
1945	1st Div	24	16	7	1	39	1st	(Myanmar) Fred Pugsley	21
1946	1st Div	24	20	3	1	43	1st	(British Raj) Swamy Nayaar	36
1947 (Note: Not held due to communal riots of 1947.)	1st Div	—	—	—	—	—	—	—	—
1948	1st Div	24	16	5	3	37	3rd	(India) P. B. A. Saleh	10
1949	1st Div	26	22	1	3	45	1st	(India) Abid	22
1950	1st Div	26	19	7	0	45	1st	(India) K. P. Dhanraj	18
1951	1st Div	25	17	4	4	38	2nd	(India) K. P. Dhanraj (India) P. Venkatesh	11
1952	1st Div	26	17	6	3	40	1st	(India) K. P. Dhanraj	10
1953	1st Div	17	13	3	1	29	Abandoned (Note: League abandoned midway due to riots in Kolkata.)	(India) Ahmed Khan (Pakistan) Masood Fakhri	5
1954	1st Div	28	15	6	7	36	3rd	(India) Ahmed Khan	9
1955	1st Div	26	15	5	6	35	3rd	(India) S Roy	11
1956	1st Div	26	16	8	2	40	2nd	(Pakistan) Moosa Ghazi	10
1957	1st Div	26	18	6	2	42	2nd	(Pakistan) Moosa Ghazi	8
1958	1st Div	28	16	8	4	40	3rd	(India) K. P. Dhanraj	7
1959	1st Div	28	21	4	3	46	2nd	(India) Tulsidas Balaram	23
1960	1st Div	28	17	7	4	41	3rd	(India) Narayan	8
1961	1st Div	28	22	3	3	47	1st	(India) Tulsidas Balaram	23
1962	1st Div	28	14	12	2	40	2nd (Note: Mohun Bagan won the play-off match 2–0.)	(India) Sunil Nandi	9
1963	1st Div	28	21	4	3	46	2nd	(India) Ashim Moulik	19
1964	1st Div	28	19	8	1	46	2nd	(India) Ashim Moulik	20
1965	1st Div	28	19	8	1	46	2nd	(India) Ashim Moulik	13
1966	1st Div	28	25	2	1	52	1st	(India) Parimal Dey	19
1967	1st Div	28	21	5	2	47	2nd	(India) Parimal Dey	10
1968	1st Div	15	12	1	2	25	Abandoned	(India) Sarmad Khan	8
1969	1st Div	20	14	6	0	34	2nd	(India) Ashok Chatterjee	11
1970	1st Div	22	19	3	0	41	1st	(India) Swapan Sengupta	14
1971	1st Div	19	18	1	0	37	1st	(India) Shyam Thapa	14
1972	1st Div	19	18	1	0	37	1st	(India) Md. Akbar	17
1973	1st Div	20	17	2	1	36	1st	(India) Subhash Bhowmick	24
1974	1st Div	19	17	2	0	36	1st	(India) Md. Akbar (India) Surajit Sengupta	14
1975	1st Div	21	21	0	0	42	1st	(India) Subhash Bhowmick	14
1976	1st Div	22	20	1	1	41	2nd	(India) Shyam Thapa	12
1977	1st Div	22	22	0	0	44	1st	(India) Ranjit Mukherjee	18
1978	1st Div	22	19	1	2	39	2nd	(India) Ranjit Mukherjee	18
1979	1st Div	22	19	3	0	41	2nd	(India) Shabbir Ali	23
1980	1st Div	12	9	3	0	21	Abandoned	(Iran) Jamshid Nassiri (Iran) Majid Bishkar (India) Tapan Das	3
1981	1st Div	26	21	2	3	58	3rd	(Iran) Jamshid Nassiri	18
1982	1st Div	26	23	3	0	49	1st	(India) Arup Das	11
1983	1st Div	26	19	6	1	44	2nd	(India) Mihir Bose	8
1984	1st Div (Note: A team earned three points for a win from this year)	26	20	5	1	65	2nd	(India) Debasish Roy	22
1985	1st Div	28	22	5	1	71	1st	(Iran) Jamshid Nassiri	17
1986	1st Div	28	19	9	0	66	2nd	(Nigeria) Emeka Ezeugo	14
1987	1st Div	28	25	3	0	78	1st	(Nigeria) Chima Okorie	26
1988	1st Div	28	22	5	1	71	1st	(India) Pradip Talukdar (India) Bikash Panji	8
1989	1st Div	28	24	2	2	74	1st	(Nigeria) Chima Okorie	27
1990	Super Div (Note: Top Division renamed as Super Div)	18	13	3	2	42	2nd	(Nigeria) Chima Okorie	9
1991	Super Div	18	14	4	0	46	1st	(India) Kuljit Singh	10
1992	Super Div	18	9	6	3	28	3rd (Note: East Bengal were deducted five points for using an over-age player in three matches.)	(India) Kuljit Singh	9
1993	Super Div	18	16	2	0	50	1st	(India) Sanjay Majhi	12
1994	Super Div	18	14	4	0	46	2nd (Note: Mohun Bagan won the title on fewer goals conceded.)	(India) Bhaichung Bhutia	14
1995	Super Div	18	13	3	2	42	1st	(India) Nima Bhutia	8
1996	Super Div	18	12	6	0	42	1st	(India) Tausif Jamal	6
1997	Super Div	18	14	3	1	45	2nd	(Brazil) Preto Garcia	5
1998	Super Div	15	13	1	1	40	1st (Note: East Bengal won the play-off 1–0 against Mohun Bagan.)	(India) Dipendu Biswas	8
1999	Super Div	13	11	2	0	35	1st	(Ghana) Suley Musah	4
2000	Super Div	13	11	2	0	35	1st	(India) Dipendu Biswas	4
2001	Super Div	13	8	4	1	28	2nd	(Nigeria) Omolaja Olaleken	8
2002	Super Div	13	9	3	1	30	1st (Note: East Bengal won the play-off 1–0 against Mohammedan Sporting.)	(Nigeria) Mike Okoro	12
2003	Super Div	16	13	2	1	41	1st (Note: East Bengal won the play-off 5–4 in penalties after the match ended 1–1 against Mohun Bagan.)	(Nigeria) Mike Okoro	10
2004	Super Div	18	11	6	1	39	1st	(Brazil) Douglas Da Silva	9
2005	Premier Div	14	11	1	2	34	2nd	(India) Syed Rahim Nabi	8
2006	Premier Div	14	10	2	2	32	1st	(India) Alvito D'Cunha	4
2007	Premier Div	14	8	2	4	26	2nd	(Brazil) Edmilson	12
2008	Premier Div	14	7	4	3	25	3rd	(India) Parveen Kumar	4
2009	Premier Div	15	8	6	1	30	3rd	(India) Budhiram Tudu	10
2010	Premier Div	16	14	1	1	43	1st	(Nigeria) Penn Orji	9
2011	Premier Div	10	8	0	2	24	1st	(Australia) Tolgay Ozbey	9
2012	Premier Div	17	16	1	0	49	1st	(India) Baljit Sahni	14
2013	Premier Div	10	8	1	1	25	1st	(Nigeria) Chidi Edeh	7
2014	Premier Div	10	8	1	1	25	1st	(Nigeria) Dudu Omagbemi	8
2015	Premier Div	10	9	1	0	28	1st	(South Korea) Do Dong-hyun	12
2016	Premier Div	10	10	0	0	30	1st	(South Korea) Do Dong-hyun	4
2017	Premier Div	9	7	2	0	23	1st (Note: East Bengal Champions on goal difference.)	(Trinidad and Tobago) Willis Plaza (India) V.P. Suhair	5
2018	Premier Div	11	7	2	2	23	3rd	(India) Jobby Justin	4
2019	Premier Div	11	6	2	3	20	3rd (Note: The game between East Bengal and Calcutta Customs was rescheduled because of unplayable weather and ground conditions. However on the later date, East Bengal did not turn up and Customs were awarded a 3–0 win.)	(Spain) Jaime Colado	7
2020	Premier Div	—	—	—	—	—	Not Held (Note: The 2020-21 Calcutta Football League was not held because of the COVID-19 pandemic.)	—	—
2021	Premier Div	—	—	—	—	—	DNP (Note: East Bengal informed the IFA of the unavailability of their team and decided not to participate in the tournament. The IFA decided to hand Byes to all the opponents in the respective fixtures that were announced.)	—	—
2022	Premier Div — Super Six	4	0	3	1	3	4th	(India) Jesin TK (India) Vivek Singh	1
2023	Premier Div	17	13	3	1	42	2nd	(India) P. V. Vishnu (India) Jesin TK (India) Abhishek Kunjam	6
2024	Premier Div	17	15	2	0	47	1st (Note: On 20 September 2025, the Indian Football Association declared East Bengal as the champions of 2024 Calcutta Football League after the Calcutta High Court overrulled the stay order put by the district court over announcing East Bengal as the champions.)	(India) Jesin TK	13
2025	Premier Div	15	11	2	2	35	1st	(India) Vanlalpeka Guite	6
2026	Premier Div	14	9	5	0	32	2nd	(India) Akash Hemram	10

== IFA Shield ==
The IFA Shield is the second oldest football tournament in India after the Durand Cup, and the fourth oldest football competition in the world. East Bengal featured in the IFA Shield for the first time in 1921 and crashed out in the second round against Dalhousie in the fourth replayed-match after three drawn matches. They won their maiden IFA Shield title in 1943, defeating Police AC 3–0 in the final. Since then, the club has won it 28 times (also once in 2018 when the tournament was played as a U-19 event), the most ever in the tournament's history.

As of 8 October 2026

East Bengal in IFA Shield
Season	Final position	Opponent team	Score
1920	—	—	—
1921	2nd Round	Dalhousie	1–1; 1–1; 1–1; 1–2
1922	3rd Round	Jamalpur XI	0–2
1923	1st Round	Calcutta	0–1
1924	2nd Round	Calcutta	0–1
1925	3rd Round	Heavy Battery	0–0; 1–1; 1–3
1926	1st Round	Royal West Kent	1–1; 0–1
1927	2nd Round	Calcutta	0–1
1928	1st Round	Royal Scot Fusiliers	1–2
1929	2nd Round	Sherwood Foresters	0–0; 2–4
1930	Withdrew	—	—
1931	1st Round	Police	0–0; 0–2
1932	1st Round	K.R.R.	0–3
1933	2nd Round	Shropshire	1–6
1934	1st Round	K.R.R.	0–2
1935	1st Round	E.I.R. (Jamshedpur)	1–2
1936	3rd Round	East Yorks	0–1
1937	3rd Round	Customs	0–2
1938	3rd Round	Howrah Union	0–1
1939	Withdrew	—	—
1940	2nd Round	Delhi XI	0–1
1941	Semi-Finals	Aryan	0–1
1942	RU	Mohammedan Sporting	0–1
1943	W	Police	3–0
1944	RU	B&A Railway	0–2
1945	W	Mohun Bagan	1–0
1946	Not Held	—	—
1947	RU	Mohun Bagan	0–1
1948	Semi-Finals	Bhawanipore	0–1
1949	W	Mohun Bagan	2–0
1950	W	Services XI	3–0
1951	W	Mohun Bagan	0–0; 2–0
1952	Quarter-Finals	Bangalore Blues	0–1
1953	RU	Indian Culture League	0–0; 0–0; 1–1 (Note: East Bengal was scratched for fielding two Pakistani players: Niaz and Fakhri.)
1954	Withdrew	—	—
1955	Semi-Finals	Rajasthan	0–1
1956	Semi-Finals	Aryan	0–1
1957	Semi-Finals	Mohammedan Sporting	1–1; 0–1
1958	W	Mohun Bagan	1–1; 1–0
1959	Abandoned	—	—
1960	Quarter-Finals	Indian Navy	0–3
1961	W	Mohun Bagan	0–0; 0–0 (Note: Joint Winners.)
1962	Semi-Finals	Hyderabad XI	0–1
1963	Quarter-Finals	Mohammedan Sporting	1–2
1964	Abandoned	Mohun Bagan	1–1; (Note: Trophy abandoned after the final.)
1965	W	Mohun Bagan	0–0; 1–0
1966	W	BNR	1–0
1967	Abandoned	Mohun Bagan	0–0; (Note: Final remained incomplete.)
1968	Abandoned	—	(Note: Abandoned due to court injunction)
1969	RU	Mohun Bagan	1–3
1970	W	PAS Tehran	
1971	Semi-Finals	Tollygunge Agragami	0–1
1972	W	Mohun Bagan	0–0; w/o (Note: Abandoned due to rain during the replay. MB refused to play again & were scratched.)
1973	W	Pyongyong City	3–1
1974	W	Mohun Bagan	1–0
1975	W	Mohun Bagan	5–0
1976	W	Mohun Bagan	0–0
1977	RU	Mohun Bagan	0–1
1978	Semi-Finals	Ararat Yerevan	0–1
1979	RU	Mohun Bagan	0–1
1980	Not Held	—	—
1981	W	Mohun Bagan	2–2
1982	Semi-Finals	Mohammedan Sporting	0–1
1983	W	Aryan	0–0
1984	W	Mohun Bagan	1–0
1985	Semi-Finals	Peñarol	1–1; 2–4 (p)
1986	W	Mohun Bagan	0–0; 4–2 (p)
1987	Semi-Finals	Punjab Police	0–0; 2–4 (p)
1988	Abandoned	—	—
1989	—	—	—
1990	W	Mohammedan Sporting	1–0 (Note: Abandoned midway as Md.Sporting refused to continue.)
1991	W	Army XI	3–1
1992	Abandoned	—	—
1993	Semi-Finals	Pakhtakor Tashkent	0–0; 2–4 (p)
1994	W	Mohun Bagan	2–1
1995	W	Md. Sporting (Dhaka)	1–1; 3–1 (p)
1996	QF Group Stage	—	—
1997	W	FC Kochin	3–2
1998	RU	Mohun Bagan	1–2
1999	Semi-Finals	Tollygunge Agragami	0–0; 4–5 (p)
2000	W	Mohun Bagan	1–1; 4–1 (p)
2001	W	Palmeiras	0–1 (Note: Abandoned after 35 minutes after a brawl on the pitch, Palmeiras were scratched.)
2002	W	Churchill Brothers	0–0; 5–4 (p)
2003	RU	Mohun Bagan	0–0; 3–5 (p)
2004	Semi-Finals	Mohun Bagan	1–1; 6–7 (p)
2005	Semi-Finals	Eveready	1–2
2006	QF Group Stage	—	—
2007	QF Group Stage	—	—
2008	Not Held	—	—
2009	QF Group Stage	—	—
2010	QF Group Stage	—	—
2011	W	Prayag United	0–0; 4–2 (p)
2012	RU	Prayag United	0–1
2013	Fourth	Prayag United	1–1; 4–5 (p)
2014–19 (Note: Held as a U-19 tournament.)	—	—	—
2020	DNP	—	—
2021	DNP	—	—
2022–24	Not Held	—	—
2025	RU	Mohun Bagan SG	1–1; 4–5 (p)
2026	RU	Mohun Bagan SG	0–1

== Durand Cup ==
The Durand Cup is the oldest tournament in Asia and is still ongoing as a part of the primary Indian football calendar. Before 1926, the Indian clubs were not allowed to participate in the tournament. East Bengal participated in the tournament for the first time in 1926 and reached the third round, before losing to the eventual champions the Durham Light Infantry. The Indian clubs were again not allowed to participate until after Independence of India, after when the tournament restarted again in 1950, organised by the Indian Armed Forces.

East Bengal won their first Durand Cup title in 1951, defeating Rajasthan Club 2–1 in the final. The Red and Gold brigade have since then won the tournament 17 times, joint most alongside arch-rivals Mohun Bagan, for the most titles in the tournament's history.

As of 23 August 2026

East Bengal in Durand Cup
Season	Final position	Opponent team	Score
1921–25 (Note: Indian Teams were not allowed to participate)	—	—	—
1926	Third Round	Durham Light Infantry	1–4
1927–40	—	—	—
1940–49 (Note: Tournament not held due to World War II and Partition of India.)	—	—	—
1950	Semi-Finals	Hyderabad City Police	0–1
1951	Champions	Rajasthan Club	2–1
1952	Champions	Hyderabad City Police	1–0
1953	Quarter-Finals	National Defence Academy	2–0
1954	Semi-Finals	HAL	1–4
1955	Third Round	Madras Regimental Centre	0–2
1956	Champions	Hyderabad City Police	2–0
1957	Runners-up	Hyderabad City Police	1–2
1958	Semi-Finals	Madras Regimental Centre	1–2
1959	Semi-Finals	Mohammedan Sporting	1–5
1960	Champions	Mohun Bagan	1–1; 0–0 (Note: Joint Champions with Mohun Bagan)
1961	Semi-Finals	Andhra Police	1–1; 0–3
1962 (Note: Tournament not held due to Sino-Indian War.)	—	—	—
1963	Semi-Finals	Andhra Police	1–2
1964	Runners-up	Mohun Bagan	0–2
1965	Quarter-Finals	Delhi Garrison	0–1
1966	Quarter-Finals	E.M.E Centre	0–1
1967	Champions	B.N.R	1–0
1968	Runners-up	Border Security Force	0–1
1969	Semi-Finals	Punjab Police	0–1
1970	Champions	Mohun Bagan	2–0
1971	Not held	—	—
1972	Champions	Mohun Bagan	0–0; 1–0
1973	Semi-Finals	Rajasthan Armed Constabulary	1–2
1974	Semi-Finals	Mohun Bagan	0–1
1975	QF Group Stage	—	—
1976	Semi-Finals	JCT	0–0; tiebreaker
1977	QF Group Stage	—	—
1978	Champions	Mohun Bagan	3–0
1979–81	DNP	—	—
1982	Champions	Mohun Bagan	0–0
1983	DNP	—	—
1984	Runners-up	Mohun Bagan	0–1
1985	DNP	—	—
1986	Runners-up	Mohun Bagan	0–1
1987	Semi-Finals	Mohun Bagan	0–3
1988	Runners–up	Border Security Force	2–3
1989	Champions	Mohun Bagan	0–0; 3–1 (p)
1990	Champions	Mahindra & Mahindra	3–2
1991	Champions	Border Security Force	1–1; 5–3 (p)
1992	QF Group Stage	—	—
1993	Champions	Punjab State Electricity Board	1–0
1994	Runners-up	Mohun Bagan	0–1
1995	Champions	Tata Football Academy	0–0; 4–3 (p)
1996–97	—	—	—
1998	Runners-up	Mahindra & Mahindra	1–2
1999	Runners-up	Salgaocar	0–0; 2–3 (p)
2000	Semi-Finals	Mahindra & Mahindra	1–1; 5–6 (p)
2001	Semi-Finals	Churchill Brothers	1–2
2002	Champions	Indian Army XI	3–0
2003	Runners-up	Salgaocar	1–1; 3–4 (p)
2004	Champions	Mohun Bagan	2–1
2005	QF Group Stage	—	—
2006	QF Group Stage	—	—
2007–08	—	—	—
2009	QF Group Stage	—	—
2010	Semi-Finals	Chirag United	0–1
2011–18	—	—	—
2019	Semi-Finals	Gokulam Kerala	1–1; 2–3 (p)
2020 (Note: Tournament not held due to COVID-19 pandemic in India.)	—	—	—
2021	DNP	—	—
2022	Group Stage	—	—
2023	Runners-up	Mohun Bagan SG	0–1
2024	Quarter-Finals	Shillong Lajong	1–2
2025	Semi-Finals	Diamond Harbour	1–2
2026	Champions	Mohun Bagan SG	4–1

== Rovers Cup ==
The Rovers Cup was the third most prestigious football tournament in India, alongside the Durand Cup and the IFA Shield, forming the coveted Triple Crown of Indian football. East Bengal first participated in the tournament in 1941, reaching the Quarter-Finals in their inaugural appearance before losing to the Wales Regiment. The Red and Gold brigade first lifted the Rovers Cup in 1949 and have won it 10 times when the tournament was abolished in 2001.

As of 24 August 2021

East Bengal in Rovers Cup
Season	Final position	Opponent team	Score
1921–40	—	—	—
1941	Quarter-Finals	Wales Regiment	1–3
1942–44	—	—	—
1945	Second Round	Albert David	0–2
1946–48	—	—	—
1949	Champions	E.I. Railways	3–0
1950	—	—	—
1951	Quarter-Finals	Wimco	0–1
1952–56	—	—	—
1957	Third Round	Caltex	1–3
1958	Quarter-Finals	Rajasthan Club	0–1
1959	Runners-up	Mohammedan Sporting	0–0; 0–3
1960	Runners-up	Andhra Police	0–0; 0–1
1961	Third Round	CPL Hyderabad	1–6
1962	Champions	Andhra Police	1–1; 1–1 (Note: Joint Champions with Andhra Police)
1963	Runners-up	Andhra Police	0–1
1964	Semi-Finals	BNR	0–1
1965	—	—	—
1966	Quarter-Finals	515 Army Base WS	0–1
1967	Champions	Mohun Bagan	0–0; 2–0
1968	Quarter-Finals	Leaders Club	2–3
1969	Champions	Mohun Bagan	3–0
1970	Semi-Finals	Mahindra & Mahindra	0–0; 1–2
1971	Semi-Finals	Vasco	na
1972	Champions	Mohun Bagan	0–0; 0–0 (Note: Joint Champions with Mohun Bagan)
1973	Champions	Tata Sports	3–2
1974	—	—	—
1975	Champions	Mafatlal	1–0
1976	—	—	—
1977	Semi-Finals	Mohun Bagan	0–2
1978–79	—	—	—
1980	Champions	Mohammedan Sporting	1–1 (Note: Joint Champions with Mohammedan Sporting)
1981	—	—	—
1982	Quarter-Finals	Salgaocar	na
1983	Semi-Finals	Mohammedan Sporting	na
1984–85	—	—	—
1986	Semi-Finals	Dempo	na
1987	Semi-Finals	Mohun Bagan	0–1
1988	Runners-up	Mohun Bagan	0–1
1989	—	—	—
1990	Champions	Mahindra & Mahindra	1–0
1991	QF Group Stage	—	—
1992–93	—	—	—
1994	Champions	Air India	2–1
1995–96	—	—	—
1997	Semi-Finals	Churchill Brothers	na
1998–99	—	—	—
2000	Semi-Finals	Mohun Bagan	0–1

== Federation Cup/Super Cup ==
The Federation Cup, begun in 1977, was India's primary domestic cup competition until it was scrapped in 2017 and the Super Cup was launched in its place. East Bengal first participated in the tournament in 1978 and became joint champions with Mohun Bagan in their inaugural appearance. East Bengal is the second most successful club in this tournament, having won it eight times.

As of 7 December 2025.

East Bengal in Federation Cup
Season	Final position	Opponent team	Score
1977	—	—	—
1978	Champions	Mohun Bagan	0–0; 0–0 (Note: Joint Champions with Mohun Bagan)
1979	—	—	—
1980	Champions	Mohun Bagan	1–1
1981	Semi-Finals	Mohun Bagan	0–2 (agg.)
1982	Group League	—	—
1983	Semi-Finals	Mohammedan Sporting	0–1 (agg.)
1984	Runners-up	Mohammedan Sporting	0–1
1985	Champions	Mohun Bagan	1–0 (aet)
1986	Runners-up	Mohun Bagan	0–0; 4–5 (p)
1987	Group League	—	—
1988	Group League	—	—
1989	Group League	—	—
1990	Semi-Finals	Salgaocar	2–3
1991	Group League	—	—
1992	Runners-up	Mohun Bagan	0–2
1993	Semi-Finals	Mahindra & Mahindra	0–0; 2–4 (p)
1994	Group League	—	—
1995	Runners-up	JCT	1–1; 6–7 (p)
1995	Runners-up	JCT	1–1; 3–5 (p)
1996	Champions	Dempo	2–1 (aet)
1997	Runners-up	Salgaocar	1–2 (aet)
1998	Runners-up	Mohun Bagan	1–2
1999	Not Held	—	—
2000	Not Held	—	—
2001	Second Round	Sporting Club de Goa	0–1
2002	Not Held	—	—
2003	Quarter-Finals	Vasco	0–1
2004	Quarter-Finals	Sporting Club de Goa	0–1
2005	Quarter-Finals	Churchill Brothers	0–0; 9–10 (p)
2006	Quarter-Finals	Dempo	0–1
2007	Champions	Mahindra United	2–1
2008	Semi-Finals	Mohun Bagan	1–1; 3–5 (p)
2009-10	Champions	Shillong Lajong	0–0; 3–0 (p)
2010	Champions	Mohun Bagan	1–0
2011	Runners-up	Salgaocar	1–3
2012	Champions	Dempo	3–2 (aet)
2013-14	Group League	—	—
2014-15	Group League	—	—
2015-16	Quarter-Finals	Shillong Lajong	3–4 (agg.)
2016-17	Semi-Finals	Mohun Bagan	0–2
2018	Runners-up	Bengaluru	1–4
2019	Quarter-Finals	Delhi Dynamos	w/o (Note: Walkover given by East Bengal due to protest citing unfair treatment of I-League clubs along with six other clubs.)
2020–21	Not Held	—	—
2021–22	Not Held	—	—
2023	Group stage	—	—
2024	Champions	Odisha	3—2
2025	Round of 16	Kerala Blasters	0—2
2025–26	Runners-up	Goa	0—0; 5—6 (p)
