= 2000 IFA Shield final =

- Event: 2000 IFA Shield
East Bengal	Mohun Bagan
1	1
- East Bengal won 4–1 on penalties
- Date: 16 September 2000
- Venue: Salt Lake Stadium, Kolkata, West Bengal
- Man of the Match: Sangram Mukherjee
- Attendance: 80,000 (approx.)

The 2000 IFA Shield final was the 106th final of the IFA Shield, the second oldest football competition in India, and was contested between Kolkata giants East Bengal and Mohun Bagan on 16 September 2000.

East Bengal won the final 4–1 via penalties after the game ended 1–1 after extra-time, to claim their 25th IFA Shield title.

== Route to the final ==
=== East Bengal ===
Date	Round	Opposition	Score
5 September 2000	Group Stage	BNR	1–0
8 September 2000	Group Stage	JCT	3–0
10 September 2000	Group Stage	Calcutta Port Trust	3–0
13 September 2000	Semi Final	Tollygunge Agragami	1–0

East Bengal entered the 2000 IFA Shield as one of the National Football League teams from Kolkata and were allocated into Group A alongside BNR, JCT and Calcutta Port Trust. In the opening game against BNR on 5 September, East Bengal managed a 1–0 victory courtesy of a solitary goal from Bijen Singh. In the second game, East Bengal defeated JCT 3–0 with a brace from Dipendu Biswas and Bijen Singh scoring the third for the team. East Bengal defeated Calcuta Port Trust 3–0 in the last game of the group stage with Dipendu Biswas scoring another brace and Bijen Singh scoring in third consecutive match as East Bengal topped the group with three wins and reached the last four. In the semi-finals, East Bengal defeated Tollygunge Agragami 1–0 courtesy of a solitary strike from Surkumar Singh as they reached the final.

=== Mohun Bagan ===
Date	Round	Opposition	Score
6 September 2000	Group Stage	State Bank of Travancore	3–1
9 September 2000	Group Stage	George Telegraph	3–0
11 September 2000	Group Stage	Tollygunge Agragami	1–1
14 September 2000	Semi Final	JCT	1–0

Mohun Bagan entered the 2000 IFA Shield as the defending champions and were allocated into Group B alongside State Bank of Travancore, George Telegraph and Tollygunge Agragami. In the opening game, Mohun Bagan defeated State Bank of Travancore 3–1 with Jose Ramirez Barreto scoring a brace and an own goal from Paul Anthony. Sylvester Ignatius scored the only goal for SBT. Mohun Bagan defeated George Telegraph 3–0 in the second match. Jose Barreto, R. C. Prakash and Satyajit Chatterjee scored for the team. In the last match of the group stage, Mohun Bagan drew 1–1 with Tollygunge Agragami after Bhabani Mohanty scored an early goal for Tollygunge only to be equalised by Jose Barreto in the second half as Mohun Bagan topped the group with two wins and a draw to reach the last four. In the semi-finals, Mohun Bagan defeated JCT 1–0 with Basudeb Mondal scoring the only goal taking them to the final.

== Match ==
=== Details ===
16 September 2000
16:30 IST

East Bengal	1–1 (a.e.t./g.g.)	Mohun Bagan
Chandan Das 26'	Report	Jose Ramirez Barreto 78'
Penalties
Chandan Das (penalty scored); Suley Musah (penalty scored); Ratan Singh (penalty scored); Dipendu Biswas (penalty scored)	4–1	(penalty missed) Sammy Omollo; (penalty missed) Dulal Biswas; (penalty scored) Satyajit Chatterjee

Salt Lake Stadium, Kolkata
Attendance: 80,000 (est.)
Referee: S. M. Balu (Karnataka)

East Bengal	Mohun Bagan

GK	(India) Sangram Mukherjee
RB	(India) Surkumar Singh
CB	(India) Deepak Mondal
CB	(Ghana) Jackson Egypong
LB	(India) Ratan Singh
CM	(Ghana) Suley Musah
CM	(India) Carlton Chapman (c)	(substituted off) 51'
RM	(India) Chandan Das
LM	(India) Dipankar Roy	(substituted off) 88'
ST	(India) Dipendu Biswas
ST	(India) Bijen Singh
Substitutes:
CM	(India) Tushar Rakshit	(substituted on) 51'	(substituted off) 103'
CB	(India) Anit Ghosh	(substituted on) 88'
CM	(India) Ranjan Dey	(substituted on) 103'
Manager:
(India) Syed Nayeemuddin

GK	(India) Sandip Nandy
RB	(India) Dulal Biswas
CB	(Kenya) Sammy Omollo
CB	(India) Muttah Suresh	(substituted off) 36'
LB	(India) Amitava Chanda
LM	(India) R.P. Singh	(substituted off) 71'
CM	(India) Debjit Ghosh
CM	(India) Basudeb Mondal
RM	(India) Satyajit Chatterjee (c)
ST	(India) R. C. Prakash
ST	(Brazil) Jose Ramirez Barreto
Substitutes:
MF	(Brazil) Joao Santos	(substituted on) 36'	(substituted off) 82'
MF	(India) Hussain Mustafi	(substituted on) 71'
ST	(India) Amar Ganguly	(substituted on) 82'
Manager:
(India) Anjan Chowdhury

Hero of the Match:
Sangram Mukherjee (East Bengal)

Match rules

- 90 minutes.
- 30 minutes of extra time if necessary.
- Golden goal ends game.
- Penalty shoot-out if scores still level.

== See also ==
- IFA Shield 2000, rsssf.com
- IFA Shield 2000, indianfootball.de
