= 2002–03 Durand Cup final =

Football competition in India

- Event: 2002–03 Durand Cup
East Bengal	Army XI
3	0
- Date: 10 January 2003
- Venue: Ambedkar Stadium, Delhi
- Man of the Match: Tushar Rakshit
- Attendance: 10,000 (approx.)

The 2002–03 Durand Cup final was the 115th final of the Durand Cup, the oldest football competition in India, and was contested between Kolkata giant East Bengal and Army XI on 10 January 2003 at the Ambedkar Stadium in Delhi.

East Bengal won the final 3–0 to claim their 15th Durand Cup title. Mike Okoro, Kalia Kulothungan and Douglas Silva scored three goals in the second half as East Bengal won the title.

== Route to the final ==
=== East Bengal ===
Date	Round	Opposition	Score
4 January 2003	Group Stage	Air India	4–0
6 January 2003	Group Stage	MEG	0–1
8 January 2003	Semi Final	Salgaocar	1–0

East Bengal entered the 2002–03 Durand Cup as one of the National Football League teams. They were allocated into Group B alongside MEG FC and Air India. In the opening game East Bengal defeated Air India 4–0. Mike Okoro scored a brace, Sashti Duley scored one and Osberne D'Souza scored an own-goal. In the second game, East Bengal suffered a 0–1 defeat to MEG, Bangalore as Ajith Kumar scored the only goal of the game. East Bengal still topped the group with a better goal difference and progressed into the last four. In the semi-final, East Bengal defeated Salgaocar 1–0 courtesy of a solitary strike by Mike Okoro as East Bengal reached the final.

=== Army XI ===
Date	Round	Opposition	Score
1 January 2003	Group Stage	Indian Telephone Industries	2–2
3 January 2003	Group Stage	Vasco	1–0
7 January 2003	Semi Final	Mohammedan Sporting	1–1 (5–3 pen)

Army XI entered the 2002–03 Durand Cup as one of the regimental teams and were allocated into Group C alongside Vasco and Indian Telephone Industries. In the opening game, Army XI drew 2–2 with Indian Telephone Industries. Raghu Kumar and Johny Gangmei scored for Army XI while Ibrahim Karim and Ignatious (own-goal) scored for ITI. In the second game, Army XI defeated Vasco 1–0 as Bikash Gurung scored the only goal and Army reached the last four In the semi-final, Army XI defeated Mohammedan Sporting 5–3 in the penalty shootout after the game ended 1–1 after added extra time to reach the final for the first time. Saroj Gurung equalised for Army in the injury time for Army XI after Dipendu Biswas had scored for Mohammedan Sporting.

== Match ==
=== Details ===
10 January 2003
14:30 IST

East Bengal	3–0	Army XI
Mike Okoro 67'; Kalia Kulothungan 72'; Douglas Silva 77'	Report

Ambedkar Stadium, Delhi
Attendance: 10,000 (est.)
Referee: Binod Kumar Singh (Bihar)

East Bengal	Army XI

GK	(India) VP Satish Kumar
RB	(India) Surya Bikash Chakraborty
CB	(India) Arun Malhotra
CB	(India) Subashish Roy Chowdhury
LB	(India) Y. Raju Singh
RM	(India) Shylo Malsawmtluanga
CM	(India) Chandan Das (c)	(substituted off) 65'
CM	(Brazil) Douglas Silva
LM	(India) Sasthi Duley
ST	(India) Trijit Das	(substituted off) 36'
ST	(Nigeria) Mike Okoro
Substitutes:
ST	(India) Kaustav Ghosh	(substituted in) 36'	(substituted off) 70'
CM	(India) Tushar Rakshit	(substituted in) 65'
ST	(India) Kalia Kulothungan	(substituted in) 70'
Coach:
(India) Subhash Bhowmick

GK	(India) Abungobi Singh
RB	(India) S. Ramesh
CB	(India) S. Ignatius
CB	(India) L. Angan Sangai
LB	(India) Johnny Gangmei
LM	(India) Saroj Gurung
CM	(India) Irudayaraj
CM	(India) Bikash Gurung (c)
RM	(India) Preetam Bahadur
ST	(India) Raghu Kumar
ST	(India) Pradip Debnath
Manager:
(India) Tushar Kanti Majumdar

Hero of the Match:
Tushar Rakshit (East Bengal)

Match rules

- 90 minutes.
- 30 minutes of extra time if necessary.
- Penalty shoot-out if scores still level.

== See also ==
- 115th "Pepsi" Durand Cup 2002/03, rsssf.com
- 115th "Pepsi" Durand Cup 2002/03, indianfootball.de
