= 2002–03 IFA Shield final =

- Event: 2002-03 IFA Shield
East Bengal	Churchill Brothers
0	0
- East Bengal won 5–4 on penalties
- Date: 22 January 2003
- Venue: Salt Lake Stadium, Kolkata, West Bengal
- Man of the Match: Sangram Mukherjee
- Referee: Bharat Mani (Karnataka)
- Attendance: 40,000 (approx.)

The 2002–03 IFA Shield final was the 108th final of the IFA Shield, the second oldest football competition in India, and was contested between Kolkata giants East Bengal and Churchill Brothers of Goa on 22 January 2003.

East Bengal won the final 5–4 via penalties after the game remained goal-less after extra-time, to claim their 27th IFA Shield title.

== Route to the final ==
=== East Bengal ===
Date	Round	Opposition	Score
13 January 2003	Group Stage	Indian Bank	2–1
15 January 2003	Group Stage	Churchill Brothers	0–1
17 January 2003	Group Stage	Tollygunge Agragami	2–1
19 January 2003	Semi Final	Vasco	2–0

East Bengal entered the 2002-03 IFA Shield as the defending champions and were allocated into Group A alongside Indian Bank, Churchill Brothers and Tollygunge Agragami. In the opening game against Indian Bank, East Bengal won 2–1 with goals from Tushar Rakshit and Amjad Ali Khan. Joseph scored the only goal for Indian Bank. In the second game, East Bengal faced a setback as they lost 0–1 against Churchill Brothers with Aqueel Ansari scoring the only goal for the goan side in the 83rd minute. In the last group game against Tollygunge Agragami, East Bengal won 2–1 with goals from Trijit Das and Suley Musah as they secured their place in the semi-finals. In the Semi-Final, East Bengal defeated Vasco 2–0 with goals from Suley Musah and Jiten Rai as they entered the final.

=== Churchill Brothers ===
Date	Round	Opposition	Score
11 January 2003	Group Stage	Indian Bank	0–0
13 January 2003	Group Stage	Tollygunge Agragami	1–1
15 January 2003	Group Stage	East Bengal	1–0
19 January 2003	Semi Final	TFA	3–2

Churchill Brothers entered the 2002-03 IFA Shield as one of the NFL teams and were allocated into Group A alongside Indian Bank, East Bengal and Tollygunge Agragami. In the opening game against Indian Bank, Churchill Brothers drew 0–0. In their second game against Tollygunge Agragami, Churchill failed to win again as they drew 1–1 with Kasif Jamal scoring the Churchill but Mehtab Hossain equalised for Tollygunge. In their last group game, Churchill Brothers stunned the defending champions East Bengal as they won 1–0 with Aqueel Ansari scoring the only goal of the match as they reached the semis. In the Semi-Finals, Churchill Brothers defeated Tata Football Academy 3—2 in a thriller of a game. Kasif Jamal, Yusif Yakubu and Ratan Singh scored for Churchill Brothers while Bhola Prasad and Debadrata Roy scored for TFA.

== Match ==
=== Details ===
22 January 2003
14:30 IST

East Bengal	0–0 (a.e.t.)	Churchill Brothers
	Report
Penalties
Suley Musah (penalty missed); Chandan Das (penalty scored); Kalia Kulothungan (penalty scored); Kaustav Ghosh (penalty scored); Douglas Silva (penalty scored); Shasthi Duley (penalty scored)	5–4	(penalty scored) Kasif Jamal; (penalty scored) Rajesh Meetei; (penalty scored) Noel Wilson; (penalty scored) Yusif Yakubu; (penalty missed) Roque Barreto; (penalty missed) Tiken Singh

Salt Lake Stadium, Kolkata
Attendance: 40,000 (est.)
Referee: Bharat Mani (Karnataka)

East Bengal	Churchill Brothers

GK	(India) Sangram Mukherjee
RB	(India) Amjad Ali Khan
CB	(Ghana) Suley Musah (c)
CB	(Brazil) Douglas Silva
LB	(India) Subhashish Roy Chowdhury	(substituted off) 72'
RM	(India) Sankarlal Chakraborty
CM	(India) Arun Malhotra
CM	(India) Shasthi Duley
LM	(India) Jiten Rai	(substituted off) 92'
ST	(India) Chandan Das
ST	(India) Trijit Das	(substituted off) 108'
Substitutes:
MF	(India) Soumitra Chakraborty	(substituted in) 72'
MF	(India) Kalia Kulothungan	(substituted in) 92'
DF	(India) Kaustav Ghosh	(substituted in) 108'
Manager:
(India) Subhash Bhowmick

GK	(Ghana) Edward Ansah
RB	(India) Denzie Ferrao
CB	(India) Pio Rodrigues
CB	(Nigeria) Noel Wilson
LB	(India) Zaheer Abbas	(substituted off) 92'
LM	(India) Roque Barreto
CM	(India) Aqueel Ansari
CM	(India) Kanta Singh	(substituted off) 70'
RM	(India) Kasif Jamal
ST	(India) Rajesh Meetei
ST	(Ghana) Yusif Yakubu (c)
Substitutes:
MF	(India) Ratan Singh	(substituted in) 70'
FW	(India) Tiken Singh	(substituted in) 92'
Manager:
(India) Marcos Pacheco

Hero of the Match:
Sangram Mukherjee (East Bengal)

Match rules

- 90 minutes.
- 30 minutes of extra time if necessary.
- Penalty shoot-out if scores still level.

== See also ==
- IFA Shield 2002-03, rsssf.com
- IFA Shield 2002-03, indianfootball.de
