= 1996 Indian Federation Cup final =

- Event: 1996 Indian Federation Cup
East Bengal	Dempo
2	1
- After golden goal extra time
- Date: 11 August 1996
- Venue: Salt Lake Stadium, Kolkata, West Bengal
- Man of the Match: Tushar Rakshit
- Referee: Ravi Shekhar (Maharashtra)

The 1996 Indian Federation Cup final was the 19th final of the Indian Federation Cup, the top knock-out competition in India, and was contested between Kolkata giant East Bengal and Dempo of Goa on 11 August 1996.

East Bengal won the final 2–1 courtesy of a Golden goal by Raman Vijayan in the extra-time to claim their fourth Federation Cup title.

== Route to the final ==
=== East Bengal ===
Round	Opposition	Score
R16	Air India	2–1
Quarter-final	Border Security Force	1–1 (4–3 pen)
Semi-final	Kerala Police	3–0

East Bengal entered the 1996 Indian Federation Cup as the runner's up of the tournament's previous edition. In the pre-quarter-final, they faced Air India in their opening match and won 2–1. In the quarter-final, East Bengal faced Border Security Force and in a thriller of a game, won 4–3 in the penalty shootout after the game ended 1–1 after 120 minutes. Raman Vijayan scored the only goal for East Bengal. In the semi-final, East Bengal faced Kerala Police and won the match handsomely by 3–0 with a brace from Vijayan as they reached the final.

=== Dempo ===
Round	Opposition	Score
R16	Delhi Mughals	4–0
Quarter-final	Mohun Bagan	0–0 (5-3 pen)
Semi-final	JCT Mills	3–1

In the pre-quarter-finals, Dempo faced Delhi Mughals and won it 4–0. In the quarter-final, they faced Kolkata giants Mohun Bagan and after 120 minutes the game ended 0–0 and Dempo won 5–3 via penalty shootout to reach the last four of the tournament. In the Semi-final, they faced the reigning champions JCT Mills; defeated them 3–1 to reach the final.

== Match ==
=== Details ===
11 August 1996
17:30 IST

East Bengal	2–1 (a.e.t./g.g.)	Dempo
Tushar Rakshit 14'; Raman Vijayan 107'		Camilo Goncalves 16'

Salt Lake Stadium, Kolkata
Attendance: 100,000 (est.)
Referee: Ravi Shekhar (Maharashtra)

East Bengal	Dempo

GK	(India) Hemanta Dora
LB	(India) Subir Ghosh
CB	(India) Debjit Ghosh
CB	(India) Debasish Pal Chowdhury	(substituted off) 12'
RB	(India) Ilyas Pasha
RM	(India) Ranjan Dey
CM	(India) Tushar Rakshit (c)
CM	(India) Basudeb Mondal
LM	(India) Amit Das
ST	(India) Raman Vijayan
ST	(India) Prashanta Chakraborty	(substituted off) 76'
Substitutes:
DF	(India) Arumugam Saravanan	(substituted on) 12'	(substituted off) 100'
FW	(India) Tauseef Jamal	(substituted on) 76'
MF	(India) Ansari Abdul Hamid	(substituted on) 100'
Manager:
(India) Monoranjan Bhattacharya

GK	(India) Dominic D'Souza
RB	(India) Matthew Rodrigues	(substituted off) 76'
CB	(India) Sunmani Singh
CB	(Nigeria) Christopher Kem
LB	(India) Xavier Colaco
LM	(India) Valentino Ezuego
CM	(India) Shanta Kumar	(substituted off) 61'
RM	(India) Itocha Singh
ST	(India) Camilo Goncalves (c)
ST	(India) P Manohoran
ST	(Nigeria) Lullu Nwike	(substituted off) 75'
Substitutes:
MF	(India) Marcus Carvalho	(substituted on) 61'
DF	(India) Agnolo Miranda	(substituted on) 76'
FW	(India) Mahesh Singh	(substituted on) 75'
Manager:
(India) Socorro Coutinho

Hero of the Match:
Tushar Rakshit (East Bengal)

Match rules

- 90 minutes.
- 30 minutes of extra time if necessary.
- Golden goal ends game.
- Penalty shoot-out if scores still level.

== See also ==
- 19th "Kalyani Black Label" Federation Cup 1996
