= Dipankar Roy =

Indian footballer

Personal information
- Full name: Dipankar Roy
- Date of birth: 7 November 1982 (age 44)
- Place of birth: Kolkata, West Bengal
- Height: 1.68 m (5 ft 6 in)
- Position: Midfielder

Youth career
- 1995–1997: Tata Football Academy

Senior career*
Years	Team	Apps	(Gls)
1997–1998	Tata Football Academy		
1998–1999	JCT		
1999–2009	East Bengal		
2009–2010	Mohammedan Sporting		
2010–2011	Southern Samity		
2013–2015	East Bengal	0	(0)

International career
2000	India	1	(0)
- * Club domestic league appearances and goals as of 3 November 2020

Dipankar Roy (Bengali: দীপঙ্কর রায়; born 7 November 1982) is a retired Indian professional footballer who played as a midfielder. He played most of his professional career for East Bengal in the National Football League and I-League.

== Career ==
Born in Kolkata West Bengal, Dipankar Roy began his professional career playing with the Tata Football Academy before joining JCT in 1998–99 season. After a set of impressive performances, Dipankar was signed by Kolkata giants East Bengal in 1999, where he would go on to play for the next 10 seasons winning three National Football League titles along with several other honours for the club. He joined Mohammedan Sporting in 2009. He had spells with Calcutta Premier Division side Southern Samity before rejoining East Bengal again in 2013 before finally hanging-up his boots and retire from professional football.

=== East Bengal ===
In 1999, Dipankar Roy joined East Bengal club and went on to play for the next 10 seasons. During his stay with the club, Dipankar Roy has won a total of 22 trophies which includes three National Football League titles, the famous ASEAN Club Championship title, three IFA Shield titles, two Durand Cup titles, one Federation Cup, seven Calcutta Premier Division titles and few others.

Dipankar Roy scored four goals in the National League in his maiden season and he played a pivotal role during the club's maiden NFL title win in 2000-01, scoring three goals as a midfielder. He was once again back in form during the 2003-04 National league, scoring three goals again from the midfield as East Bengal won their third NFL title.

In 2003-04 season, Dipankar Roy scored four goals in a match as East Bengal recorded their highest ever margin of victory in the tournament against Wari FC in the IFA Shield.

In 2013, Dipankar Roy rejoined the club to finally retire from professional football wearing the Red and Gold kit.

== Personal life ==
Dipankar Roy's personal life has been controversial as he was arrested in 2004 for allegedly sheltering an absconder along with co-player Sashti Duley. He was later granted bail.

== Career statistics ==
As of 1 November 2020

Club	Season	League			Cup		Others		Continental		Total	
Club	Season	Division	Apps	Goals	Apps	Goals	Apps	Goals	Apps	Goals	Apps	Goals
East Bengal	2000–01	National Football League	16	3	?	?	?	?	—	—	16	3
East Bengal	2001–02	National Football League	15	2	?	?	?	?	—	—	15	2
East Bengal	2003–04	National Football League	17	3	?	?	?	?	—	—	17	3
East Bengal	2005–06	National Football League	9	1	2	1	9 (Note: 7 Appearances in the Calcutta Football League, 1 Appearance each in the IFA Shield and Super Cup.)	1	—	—	20	3
East Bengal	2006–07	National Football League	9	0	2	0	15 (Note: 13 Appearances in the Calcutta Football League, 1 Appearance each in the IFA Shield and Durand Cup.)	1	—	—	26	1
East Bengal	2007–08	I-League	9	0	2	0	13 (Note: Appearances in the Calcutta Football League.)	2	—	—	24	2
East Bengal	2008–09	I-League	2	0	0	0	6	0	—	—	8	0
East Bengal	2013–14	I-League	0	0	0	0	2	0	—	—	2	0
East Bengal	Total		77	9	6	1	45	4	0	0	128	14

== Honours ==
=== Club ===
East Bengal

- ASEAN Club Championship (1): 2003
- National Football League (3): 2000-01, 2002-03, 2003-04
- Federation Cup (1): 2007
- Super Cup (1): 2006
- IFA Shield (3): 2000, 2001, 2002
- Durand Cup (2): 2002, 2004
- Calcutta Premier Division (7): 1999, 2000, 2002, 2003, 2004, 2006, 2013
- San Miguel International Trophy (1): 2004
- McDowell Cup (1): 2000
- All Airlines Gold Cup (1): 2001
- Independence Cup (1): 2003
