= Anit Ghosh =

Indian footballer

Personal information
- Full name: Anit Kumar Ghosh
- Date of birth: 12 February 1977 (age 49)
- Place of birth: Hooghly, West Bengal
- Height: 1.83 m (6 ft 0 in)
- Position: Defender

Youth career
- 1992–1995: Tata Football Academy

Senior career*
Years	Team	Apps	(Gls)
1996–1997	Mohun Bagan		
1997–1998	Churchill Brothers		
1998–2004	East Bengal		
2004–2005	Mohammedan Sporting		
2005	Fransa-Pax FC		
2006–2008	Mohun Bagan		
2008–2009	Mohammedan Sporting		

International career^{‡}
1994–2004	India		
- * Club domestic league appearances and goals as of 6 June 2020 ‡ National team caps and goals as of 6 June 2020

Anit Ghosh (born 12 February 1977) is a former international Indian footballer. He played as defender for several NFL and I-League clubs during a 20-year career.

== Career ==
Anit Ghosh was one of the best defenders of the country.

From 1992 to 1995 he played for Tata Football Academy, in 1996 for Mohun Bagan Club, in 1997 for Churchill Brothers.

From 1994 to 1999 he played Asian Games. In 1998 Bangkok Asian Games and in 1996 pre-World Cup. In the same year, he played the Asia Cup and in 1999 he played in the pre-Olympics.

From 1998 to 2004 he played for East Bengal Club. He captained East Bengal F.C. in the 2002–03 season. Under his captaincy, East Bengal FC won 5 tournaments. The club achieved five trophies, including National League.

From 2004 to 2005 he played for the Mohammedan club but in middle, he joined Goa Fansa Club. Again from 2006 to 2007, he played for Mohun Bagan Club and in 2008 for Mohammedan Club. In the year 2009, he played for the Small (CFL) club till the year 2012. He played for the National team for 10 years.

He holds three National League Champion titles from the East Bengal club.

== Honours ==
=== East Bengal ===
- ASEAN Club Championship (1): 2003
- National Football League (3): 2000-01, 2002-03, 2003-04
- Calcutta Football League (6): 1998, 1999, 2000, 2002, 2003
- IFA Shield (3): 2000, 2001, 2002
- Durand Cup (2): 2002
- All Airlines Gold Cup (1): 2001
- Independence Day Cup (1): 2002–03
- McDowell Cup (1): 2000
