= Debjit Ghosh =

Indian footballer and manager

Personal information
- Date of birth: 23 February 1974 (age 52)
- Place of birth: Kolkata, West Bengal, India
- Position: Defender

Team information
- Current team: East Bengal (Assistant coach)

Senior career*
Years	Team	Apps	(Gls)
1996	East Bengal		
1997–2002	Mohun Bagan		
2002–2003	Mahindra United		
2003–2006	East Bengal		
2006–2007	Mohammedan		

International career
2002	India U23		
1997–2006	India	16	(2)

Managerial career
- 2014–2015: Bhawanipore
- * Club domestic league appearances and goals

Debjit Ghosh (born 23 February 1974) is a former Indian football player. During his playing days, Ghosh played for Mohun Bagan, Mahindra United, East Bengal, and Mohammedan in the National Football League from 1996 to 2007. He also represented India between 1997 and 2006.

== Club career ==
Born in Kolkata, West Bengal, Ghosh started his playing career with Kolkata football giants East Bengal in 1996. He Joined Mohun Bagan in the Year 1997.He stayed at the club until 2002, becoming captain for one year in 2001. He moved to Mumbai-based side Mahindra United for one season before moving to Mohun Bagan Kolkata rivals, East Bengal. He stayed at the club until 2006 before moving to the third Kolkata football giant, Mohammedan. He stayed at the club for one season before retiring.

=== 2003 collapse ===
On 21 July 2003, during a 2003 ASEAN Club Championship quarter-final match for East Bengal against Persita Tangerang of Indonesia, Ghosh was knocked-out unconscious by the elbow of Tangerang player Zaenal Arief. It took five minutes before the East Bengal club doctor was able to aide Ghosh as the players and the 8,000 spectators at the stadium feared the worst. Eventually Ghosh was stretched onto an ambulance and taken to Mintohardjo NAVY Hospital with a concussion. He managed to recover and was released from the hospital that same night at 9 pm.

The collapse was described to be similar to the collapse of Cameroonian international Marc-Vivien Foé who died after a heart-related collapse during the Confederations Cup only a month before.

== International ==
Ghosh represented the India national football team from 1997 to 2006. He captained the side in 2003 during the 2003 South Asian Football Federation Gold Cup.

== Coaching career ==
=== Bhawanipore: 2014–2015 ===
In 2014 it was confirmed that Ghosh was the new head coach of Calcutta Football League side Bhawanipore. After a year with the club, Ghosh left to sign as an assistant coach at his former club, East Bengal.

== Honours ==
India

- SAFF Championship: 1997; third place: 2003

India U23

- LG Cup: 2002

East Bengal

- Federation Cup: 1996

Individual

- IndianFootball.com 'player of the Year': 2003 (with Mahindra United)
