= Chandan Dass =

Indian ghazal singer

Chandan
- Also known as: Chandan Das, Chandan Daas
- Born: 12 March 1956 (age 70)
- Origin: Delhi
- Genre: Ghazal
- Occupations: Composer, singer
- Instrument: Vocals
- Years active: 1982–present
- Labels: T-Series, Music India, Universal Music India

Chandan (born 12 March 1956) is a popular Indian ghazal singer.

== Early life and training ==
Chandan Dass began singing ghazals from the age of eight, when he started training under the tutelage of Ustad Moosa Khan. He was also trained in classical music under Pandit Mani Prasad of Delhi, a great stalwart and purist of the highest realm.

== Career ==
His first album was released in 1982, when Talat Aziz discovered and introduced him to Music India Ltd. His maiden album was an instant hit and inspired him to make many more albums. He released a number of albums and cassettes. He has composed music for all his albums and has sung for many popular TV serials and films.

He also used to perform on Doordarshan, India's national Television Network, in the serial Sugam Sangeet in 1980s along with Penaz Masani, Raj Kumar Rizvi, Rajendra Mehta and Neena Mehta.

His achievements in the field of music can be seen from the various awards he has got throughout his career. His album "Deewangi (Hindi: दीवानगी) Erotomania" was a trendsetter. Apart from being one of the most popular ghazal singers in recent times, Dass has also been composing music for mainstream Bollywood movies.

== Personal life ==
Chandan Dass considers Mehdi Hassan the father of ghazals and likes to encourage aspirants to keep the trend of ghazals as a music genre alive in India. His aim has always been to give the audiences good music and to reach out to people and touch their hearts. Chandan's compositions and ghazals are of a high order and the rendering is well balanced, flawless and of clear diction.

Chandan Dass is married to Yamini Dass and has one son, Namit Das, who is an actor and singer. His brother-in-law Jaidev Kumar is a famous Punjabi music director.

== Tours and performances ==
Chandan Dass has given innumerable live performances, not only all over India but also abroad.

- He has also toured the world with his renditions of ghazals and also performed at a live concert in the Netherlands to rave reviews.
- Chandan Dass regaled the audience in a live concert in Lucknow town of Uttar Pradesh, India on 28 November 2005 with his scintillating rendition.
- Recently, he was Chief Guest at the five-day inter-faculty youth festival and cultural fest Spandan 2013 of Banaras Hindu University held in February–March 2013.

== Discography ==
| Album | Released | Details | Songs |
|---|---|---|---|
| Introducing ... Chandan Dass | 1982 | | "Woh Chandan Ka Badan", "Haalat Maiqade Ke", "Dil Mein Kis Darja", "Yeh Chirag Benazar Hai", "Is Soch Main Baitha Hoon", "Aaj Ki Raat", "Saari Duniya Ke Sitam", "Jagmagate Sahar ke" |
| Kitne Hi Rang | 1983 | | "Khushboo Ki Tarah Aaya", "Zindagi Tujhko Manane Nikle", "Dua Karo Ke Yeh Pauda", "Khuda Ka Zikr Karen", "Dil Hi Dil Mein Khatm Hokar", "Na Jee Bharke Dekha" |
| Ghazal Usne Chhedi (Vol 2) | 1985 | | "Dhoop Bhari Chhat Pe", "Chalte Chalte Paon", "Kabhie to Aasman Se Chand Utre", "Kuchh Tabiyat Hi", "Sitam Hi Karna", "Akhiri Khat Hai Mera" |
| Inayat | 1991 | | "Shabo Roz Mausam Badalte Rahe", "Haal Dukh Dega to", "Woh Na Hoga to Kya Kami Hogi", "Tere Qareeb Rahun Ya", "Paas Rah Kar Juda Si Lagti Hai", "Teri Bewafai Ka Shukriya" |
| Deewangi | 1993 | With Anuradha Paudwal, Music Director: Lalit Sen, Lyricist: Mahendar Dehlavi | "Wo Dil Hi Kya Tere Milne Ki Jo Dua Na Kare", "Raaton Mein Gar Na Ashq Bahaun To Kya Karun", "Tumko Dekha Jahan Jahan Humne", "Kahin Chand Raah Mein Kho Gaya Kahin Chandni Bhatak Gayi", "Chhupaun Kaise Bhala Apna Pyar Duniya Se", "Tere Baghair Hai Jannat Bhi Naagawar", "Hain Meri Saansein Teri Amanat", "Ranjish Hi Sahi Dil Hi Dukhane Ke Liye Aa", "Mujhe Tum Nazar Se Gira To Rahe Ho", "Uski Gali Mein Phir Mujhe Ik Baar Le Chalo", "Koi Halchal Na Sada Hai Mujh Mein" |
| Shree Ram Bhajan | 2005 | With Anup Jalota | "Mere Ram Tera Naam", "Ram Nam Ras Peele Pyare", "Hamen To Pyare Hain Shree Ram", "Bas Ram Ka Naam Liyeja", "Ram Tumhara Dham Chhodkar" |
| Aarish (Vol 2)(Live) | 19 September 2006 | Fontana India Label | "Usne Loota Hum Lute Hain", "Idhar Zindagi Ka Janaaza", "Sar Jhukaoge To", "Yadein Lekar Nayi", "Unse Inkar To", "Peji Koyi na Nishani" |
| "Guzarish" | 19 September 2006 | | "Khelne Ke Vaaste", "Apna Gham Leke Kahin", "Mujhko Bhule Hue", "Yeh Kasak Dil Ki", "Zindagi Ke Marhale", "Mujhko to Sirf Aapka Farman", "Zikre Ulfat Jab Chala" |
| Nishaniyan | 30 October 2006 | | "Kuch To Apni Nishaniyan", "Aap Chanhenge Agar", "Jin Ke Chehre Pe", "Teri Ruswaiyon Se", "Halat-E-Mai-Kadey", "Chehron Pe Tabassum", "Har Taraf Hai Dhuan" |

== Awards ==
Chandan's efforts have been rewarded through many awards coming his way from the first Best New Ghazal Singer of 1983 to the two prestigious SUMU awards under the categories of Best Ghazal and The Best Ghazal Singer of 1993 for his album Deewangi.
