= Jaenal Ichwan =

Indonesian footballer

Personal information
- Full name: Muhammad Jaenal Ichwan
- Date of birth: 1 May 1977 (age 49)
- Place of birth: Banyuwangi, Indonesia
- Height: 1.65 m (5 ft 5 in)
- Position: Winger

Senior career*
Years	Team	Apps	(Gls)
1997–1999	Persewangi Banyuwangi	31	(3)
1999–2003	Petrokimia Putra	67	(23)
2003–2004	Deltras Sidoarjo	27	(5)
2004–2005	Persija Jakarta	16	(2)
2005–2006	Persita Tangerang	19	(1)
2006–2007	Arema Malang	28	(2)
2007–2008	PSS Sleman	22	(0)
2008–2010	Persema Malang	40	(1)
2010–2011	Persela Lamongan	15	(1)
2011–2012	Persegres Gresik	13	(7)
2012	Persebaya DU	6	(0)
2013–2014	Persewangi Banyuwangi	32	(10)
2015–2016	Persekabpas Pasuruan	11	(1)
Total		327	(56)

International career
2002–2004	Indonesia	8	(0)
- * Club domestic league appearances and goals

Muhammad Jaenal Ichwan (born 1 May 1977 in Banyuwangi) is an Indonesian former footballer.

== Club career ==
=== Petrokimia Putra ===
He played continental level when Petrokimia Putra qualified to representative of Indonesia for ASEAN Club Championship. He scored three goals for his team in championship. With this club, he won Premier Division in 2002.

=== Persela Lamongan ===
On 15 August 2010, it was reported that Persatuan Sepakbola Malang had agreed a deal with Persatuan Sepakbola Lamongan to sell Jaenal Ichwan subject to a medical.

== Honours ==
Petrokimia Putra

- Liga Indonesia Premier Division: 2002

Persija Jakarta

- Copa Indonesia runner-up: 2005

Persema Malang

- Liga Indonesia Premier Division runner up: 2008–09

Indonesia

- AFF Championship runner-up: 2002
