= Bijen Singh =

Indian footballer

Personal information
- Full name: Bijen Singh Mutum
- Date of birth: 10 February 1979 (age 47)
- Place of birth: Imphal, Manipur, India
- Height: 1.67 m (5 ft 6 in)
- Position: Forward

Youth career
- 1995–1997: Tata Football Academy

Senior career*
Years	Team	Apps	(Gls)
1997–2002	East Bengal		
2002–2003	Dempo		
2003–2005	East Bengal		
2005–2008	Mohammedan Sporting		
2008–2009	Salgaocar		

International career
2002	India U23		
2000–2004	India	2	(0)
- * Club domestic league appearances and goals

Bijen Singh Mutum (Meitei: Mutum Bijen Singh, born 10 February 1979) is a retired Indian professional footballer who played as a forward. He played most of his professional career for East Bengal in the National Football League and I-League.

== Career ==
Born in Imphal, Manipur, Bijen Singh graduated from the Tata Football Academy in 1997 and began his professional career with Kolkata giants East Bengal where he went on to play for five seasons, before moving out to Dempo in 2002. At Dempo, he spent a single season before returning to East Bengal in 2003 where he played a pivotal role in the famous 2003 ASEAN Club Championship triumph and then the National Football League title.

Bijen made his International debut against Japan in the 2006 World Cup Qualifiers. He made two appearances for the national team, both against Japan.

=== East Bengal ===
In 1997, after graduating from the Tata Football Academy, Bijen Singh joined East Bengal and went on to play for the next five seasons, and once again returning in 2003 to play two more seasons for the club. In his seven seasons with the Red and Gold brigade, Bijen Singh won a total of 18 trophies for the club, including two National Football League titles, the famous ASEAN Club Championship title, three IFA Shield titles, Durand Cup title, five Calcutta Premier Division titles and few others.

Bijen Singh was named as the captain of East Bengal in the 2000–01 season, where the team won their maiden National Football League title.

Bijen Singh was pivotal in the club's success in the 2003 ASEAN Club Championship in Jakarta where he partnered with Bhaichung Bhutia to take East Bengal to the final of the tournament. He scored the all-important winner against Persita Tangerang in the Quarter-Finals of the tournament.

Bijen was prolific in the 2003–04 season as he scored 6 goals in all competitions which earned him a callup to the national team.

== Honours ==
East Bengal

- ASEAN Club Championship: 2003
- National Football League: 2000–01, 2003–04
- Super Cup: 1997
- IFA Shield: 1997, 2000, 2001
- Durand Cup: 2004
- Calcutta Premier Division: 1998, 1999, 2000, 2003, 2004
- San Miguel International Trophy: 2004
- McDowell Cup: 1997, 2000
- All Airlines Gold Cup: 1998, 2001

India U23

- LG Cup: 2002

Manipur

- Santosh Trophy: 2002–03
