= Shylo Malsawmtluanga =

Indian footballer (born 1984)

Personal information
- Full name: Shylo Malsawmtluanga
- Date of birth: 24 October 1984 (age 42)
- Place of birth: Aizawl, Mizoram, India
- Height: 1.69 m (5 ft 7 in)
- Position: Winger

Senior career*
Years	Team	Apps	(Gls)
2002–2007	East Bengal		(22)
2007–2008	Salgaocar	16	(3)
2008–2009	Mohun Bagan		
2009–2013	United SC	29	(6)
2013–2017	East Bengal	38	(2)
2014–2015	→ Odisha (loan)	21	(0)
2017	Southern Samity	7	(2)
2017–2019	Aizawl FC	7	(0)

International career
2004	India U20		
2005–2013	India	3	(0)
- * Club domestic league appearances and goals

Shylo Malsawmtluanga, popularly known as Mama, is an Indian footballer who last played for Aizawl FC in the I-League, primarily as a winger. He was the first footballer from Mizoram to play for the national team and the Kolkata clubs Mohun Bagan and East Bengal.

== Honours ==
East Bengal

- ASEAN Club Championship: 2003
- National Football League: 2002-03, 2003-04
- Calcutta Football League: 2002, 2003, 2004, 2006, 2013, 2014, 2015
- Durand Cup: 2002, 2004
- IFA Shield: 2002
- Super Cup: 2006
- Independence Day Cup: 2002
- San Miguel International Cup: 2004

India U20

- South Asian Games Silver medal: 2004
