= Suley Musah =

Ghanaian professional footballer

Personal information
- Full name: Suley Musah
- Date of birth: 6 May 1979 (age 47)
- Place of birth: Ghana
- Height: 1.83 m (6 ft 0 in)
- Positions: Centre-back; right-back

Senior career*
| Years | Team | Apps | (Gls) |
| 1996–1998 | Afienya United FC | | |
| 1998–2004 | East Bengal | | (30) |
| 2004–2005 | Tollygunge Agragami | | |
| 2005–2006 | Mohammedan SC | | |
| 2006–2008 | Air India | | |
| 2008–2009 | East Bengal | | |
- * Club domestic league appearances and goals

Suley Musah (born 6 May 1979) is a retired Ghanaian professional footballer.

== Career ==
Suley Musah began his career at Afienya United FC as a right back in the Ghana Premier League. In 1998, he signed for East Bengal FC along with fellow countrymen Jackson Egypong and Emmanuel Opoku to play in the National Football League. Musah spent 6 seasons in the East Bengal colours before leaving for Tollygunge Agragami in 2004–05. In 2005-06 he joined Mohammedan Sporting and after 1 season, he joined Air India in 2006 where he spent 2 seasons. He returned to play for East Bengal in 2008–09 season, before retiring from professional football.

In 2000–01 season, Suley Musah along with countryman Jackson Egypong, under coach Monoranjan Bhattacharya helped East Bengal FC win their first National Football League title. East Bengal conceded just 9 goals, the fewest goals they ever conceded in the league till date.

In 2002–03 season, Suley Musah had the best season in India with East Bengal FC, under coach Subhash Bhowmick, as the Red and Gold brigade won all 5 tournaments that they had participated in: 2002 Calcutta Football League, 2002 IFA Shield, 2002 Durand Cup, 2002-03 National Football League and Independence Day Cup; equaling their own record of winning 5 trophies in a season which they achieved back in 1972-73 and 1973–74 season.

In 2003–04 season, Suley Musah captained the East Bengal FC side and won 2003-04 National Football League, 2003 Calcutta Football League and 2003 ASEAN Club Championship held in Jakarta, Indonesia defeating 2002–03 AFC Champions League runners-up BEC Tero Sasana 3–1 in the final.

In his career in Indian football with East Bengal FC, Suley Musah has scored 41 goals in the Red and Gold colours and have won 19 trophies including 3 National Football League titles.

== Honours ==
=== Club ===
East Bengal

- ASEAN Club Championship (1): 2003
- National Football League (3): 2000-01, 2002-03, 2003-04
- Calcutta Football League (6): 1998, 1999, 2000, 2002, 2003, 2004
- IFA Shield (3): 2000, 2001, 2002
- Durand Cup (2): 2002, 2004
- All Airlines Gold Cup (1): 2001
- Independence Day Cup (1): 2002-03
- San Miguel International Cup (1): 2004
- McDowell Cup (1): 2000

Sporting positions
| Preceded by Anit Ghosh | Kingfisher East Bengal captain 2003-2004 | Succeeded by Sangram Mukherjee |
