= Kalia Kulothungan =

Indian footballer

K. P. Kulothungan
Personal information
- Full name: Kalia Perumal Kulothungan
- Date of birth: 28 September 1977
- Place of birth: Thanjavur, Tamil Nadu, India
- Date of death: 28 July 2018 (aged 40)
- Place of death: Thanjavur, Tamil Nadu, India
- Height: 1.65 m (5 ft 5 in)
- Position: Midfielder

Senior career*
Years	Team	Apps	(Gls)
2002–2005	East Bengal F.C.		(10)
2005–2007	Mohammedan S.C.		(6)
2007–2009	Mumbai F.C.		(8)
2009–2010	Mohun Bagan A.C.		(1)
2010–2012	Viva Kerala		
2012–2018	Bhawanipore F.C.		
- * Club domestic league appearances and goals

Kulothungan (28 September 1977 – 28 July 2018) was an Indian footballer. At the time of his death, he was playing for Bhawanipore F.C. in the 2nd Division I-League.

== Career ==
=== East Bengal ===
He was a member of the East Bengal team which won the ASEAN Club Championship 2003 and won back to back I-Leagues in 2002–03 and 2003–04 under the coaching of Subhash Bhowmick.

=== Mohammedan Sporting ===
Kalia scored the equalizer for his side in the pre-quarter final of the 29th Federation Cup in 2007, however his side had lost 1–3 to city rivals East Bengal in the match.

=== Bhawanipore ===
In the quarter final of the 2012 Sikkim Gold Cup, he scored in the 3–1 win over Dimapur United on 5 November.

=== Death ===
Kulothungan died in a road accident on 28 July 2018.

== Honours ==
East Bengal

- IFA Shield: 2002
