= 1996 Indian Federation Cup =

21st edition of the Federation Cup

1996 Federation Cup
Tournament details
- Country: India
- Dates: 29 June – 11 August 1996
- Teams: 16

Final positions
- Champions: East Bengal (4th title)
- Runners-up: Dempo
- Asian Cup Winners' Cup: East Bengal

Tournament statistics
- Matches played: 16
- Goals scored: 61 (3.81 per match)

The 1996 Indian Federation Cup was the 21st season of the Indian Federation Cup. The tournament started on 29 June 1996 to 11 August. The competition was won by East Bengal, who defeated Dempo 2–1 in the final.

== Round of 16 ==
Home team	Score	Away team
Mohun Bagan	5–0	TG Venkatesh XI
East Bengal	2–1	Air India
Salgaocar	4–2	Mohammedan
Kerala Police	1–0	Indian Bank Chennai
JCT Mills	6–0	Titanium XI
Dempo	4–0	Delhi Mugals
Churchill Brothers	0–1	Indian Telephone Industries
Mahindra & Mahindra	0–1	Border Security Force

== Quarter-finals ==
Home team	Score	Away team
Dempo	5–3	Mohun Bagan
East Bengal	4–3	Border Security Force
JCT Mills	2–0	Salgaocar
Kerala Police	1–0	Indian Telephone Industries

== Semi-finals ==
Home team	Score	Away team
Dempo	3–1	JCT Mills
East Bengal	3–0	Kerala Police

== Third-Place match ==
1? August

Kerala Police	1–5	JCT Mills
		Bhutia 5', 29', 38', 55', 62'

== Final ==
11 August 1996
17:30 IST

East Bengal	2–1 (a.e.t./g.g.)	Dempo
Tushar Rakshit 14'; Raman Vijayan 107'		Camilo Goncalves 16'

Salt Lake Stadium, Kolkata
Attendance: 100,000 (est.)
Referee: K Shankar (Tamil Nadu)
