= Muttath Suresh =

Indian footballer

Personal information
- Full name: Muttath suresh
- Date of birth: 19 May 1978 (age 48)
- Place of birth: Edattummal, Kerala, India
- Position: Defender

Senior career*
Years	Team	Apps	(Gls)
2000–2001	Mohun Bagan	??	(0)
2001–2002	Mahindra United	??	(0)
2002–2010	East Bengal	??	(0)
2010–2011	United Sikkim FC	0	(0)

International career
2000-2007	India	70	(4)
- * Club domestic league appearances and goals

Muttath Suresh (born 19 May 1978) is a former Indian footballer. He is a defender, former indian player, former east bengal club captain, federation cup winning captain for east bengal, two time national league winner, IFA Shield winner, ASEAN Club Championship winner.

== Career ==
Suresh Muttath, commonly known as Suresh Dada to Kolkata football fans, was born on May 19, 1978, in Etatummal, Kasargod district, who has been the defender of India for many years, and has impressed Mohun Bagan, East Bengal and several other clubs across india with his style of play. History has it that Suresh Muttath, who combined his strength, height, size and body with a desire for success and sincerity, started hitting the ball on the field from the peak of poverty by following the path of his father Krishnan, who was a former player of Madras regiment. His footballing journey started from Thrikkarippur, his native place. Suresh was only fifteen years old when he stepped into the Indian school team camp after a great start to his playing career. He left his childhood and played football with full maturity in the school team. He was involved in many achievements of the school team. Suresh, who joined the Kozhikode University team from Nehru College Kanhangad, was groomed by Usman and Victor Manjila. In those years, Suresh worked his magic in the under-21 state team and the junior team with his well laced boots. Under the tutelage of Sreedharan and Peethambaran, he performed well in the U21 kerala team. He scored an excellent goal too in the opening game. Even before the end of that season, he made his name echoed across Kerala by participating in the Kerala team for the National Games and the preparations for the Madras-Coimbatore Santosh Trophy matches.

After the Santosh Trophy held at Thrissur, Suresh was called up by Mohan Bagan. A move from wing-back to stopper-back at the hands of Subrota Bhattacharya there, and a Durant Cup win in his first season, were all enough to make Suresh a notable star of the Kolkata side. He then won his second Durant Cup at Mahindra United the following year. Later, on the way back to Kolkata, he joined the Mohun Bagan's arch-rivals East Bengal. Suresh was able to win the Durant Cup for 3 consecutive seasons. When East Bengal won the Federation Cup after twenty-two long years, the captain of that ship was none other than this legend. Again the ASEAN Cup, IFA Shield and two National League titles came to him. He was able to guard the defense of his country from 2000 to 2007 due to his playing excellence and discipline on the field. Suresh had also netted a couple of goals for India too. One against Rwanda at the 2003 Afro-Asian Games. Suresh won the 2005 SAF Championship too in his playing years. Suresh Muttath, joined the United Sikkim Football Club in 2010.

== Honours ==
India

- SAFF Championship: 2005; third place: 2003

East Bengal

- ASEAN Club Championship: 2003
