= Douglas Silva (footballer, born 1974) =

Brazilian footballer (born 1974)

Personal information
- Full name: Douglas Silva
- Date of birth: 19 May 1974 (age 52)
- Place of birth: São Paulo, Brazil
- Height: 1.82 m (6 ft 0 in)
- Positions: Midfielder; defender

Senior career*
Years	Team	Apps	(Gls)
1991–1994	Mauaense		
1995–1996	Santos FC		
1997–2000	Noroeste		
2000–2002	Sampaio Correa		
2002–2005	East Bengal		
2005-2006	Mohammedan SC		
2007-2009	Mohun Bagan		
2009-2012	VB Sports Club		
2012-2013	Bhawanipore F.C.		

Managerial career
- 2014–2015: Mohun Bagan SAIL Academy
- 2015–2016: Andreense FC
- 2016–2017: Mercedes Benz Club
- 2017–2018: Bandeirante SC
- 2018–2019: VB Sports Club
- 2019: TRAU F.C.
- 2021–2024: Arambagh KS
- 2024-
- Bishop Canning Sport Academy
- * Club domestic league appearances and goals

Douglas de Silva (born 19 May 1974 in São Paulo, Brazil) is a retired Brazilian professional footballer, who played as a midfielder and defender for various teams, including Santos FC, East Bengal FC.

== Career ==
Douglas Silva started his career with the youth academy of Palmeiras FC in Brazil and got his major break when he signed for Santos FC in São Paulo in 1995. In 2002, he signed for East Bengal FC in India and won 11 trophies in 3 years at the club, including two back-to-back National Football League titles and ASEAN Club Championship title in 2003 in Jakarta defeating BEC Tero Sasana 3-1 in the final. He also had brief stints with other clubs in Kolkata - Mohammedan Sporting in 2005-06 and Mohun Bagan in 2006-08. He retired in 2013, after playing a solitary season for Kolkata club Bhawanipore F.C.

In 2014, Douglas took over as the head coach of Mohun Bagan SAIL Academy, however, he left after one year. In 2019, he was appointed as the head coach of newly-promoted side TRAU F.C. who will be playing in the 2019-20 I-League.

=== East Bengal FC (2002-2005) ===
In 2002, Douglas signed for East Bengal FC along with compatriot Gilmar da Silva. Under coach Subhash Bhowmick, East Bengal FC went on to win all 5 tournaments they participated in: National Football League, 2002 Calcutta League, 2002 Durand Cup, 2002 IFA Shield and 2002 Independence Day Cup.

In 2003, Douglas helped East Bengal FC win the ASEAN Club Championship title. He also helped the team win back-to-back National Football League title.

In 2004, Douglas became the top scorer of Calcutta Football League by scoring 9 goals and helped East Bengal FC win it 3 times in a row. He also won the 2004 Durand Cup with the Red and Gold before he left the club after an injury during the season.

He won 11 trophies with the club in his 3 years at East Bengal FC.

== Coaching career ==
=== TRAU: 2019 ===
On 23 October 2019, it was announced that Douglas Silva would take over as head coach of I-League side TRAU. He coached his first game for the club on 1 December 2019 against Chennai City FC.

== Statistics ==
=== Managerial statistics ===
As of 13 December 2019.

Team	From	To	Record				
Team	From	To	G	W	D	L	Win %
(India) TRAU	23 October 2019	present	6	2	1	3	33.33
Total			6	2	1	3	33.33

== Honours ==
=== Club ===
East Bengal FC

- National Football League: 2002-03, 2003-04
- ASEAN Club Championship: 2003
- Calcutta Football League: 2002, 2003, 2004
- Durand Cup: 2002, 2004
- IFA Shield: 2002
- San Miguel International Cup: 2004
- Independence Day Cup: 2002

Mohun Bagan

- Federation Cup: 2006
- Calcutta Football League: 2007
