= Mike Okoro =

Nigerian footballer

Personal information
- Date of birth: 30 December 1981 (age 44)
- Place of birth: Enugu, Nigeria
- Height: 1.75 m (5 ft 9 in)
- Position: Forward

Youth career
- Kogi United

Senior career*
Years	Team	Apps	(Gls)
1999	Bendel Insurance		
2000	GKS Katowice	14	(1)
2000–2001	Amica Wronki II		
2000–2001	Amica Wronki	2	(0)
2001–2002	Indian Telephone Industries	20	(8)
2002–2004	East Bengal FC	37	(20)
2004–2005	Sparta Szamotuły		
2005–2006	East Bengal FC	12	(1)
2006–2009	Mohammedan SC		
2009	Sparta Szamotuły		
2010	JCT F.C.	13	(5)
2011	Grom Plewiska		
2011–2013	Świt Piotrowo		
2014–2015	Pogoń Lwówek	18	(2)
2015–2016	Sokół Pniewy	9	(4)
- * Club domestic league appearances and goals

Mike Emmanuel Okoro // (born 30 December 1981) is a Nigerian former professional footballer who played as a forward.

== Club career ==
After a successful 2001–02 campaign with Indian Telephone Industries, Okoro reportedly received offers from Germany, Kolkata, Mumbai, and Goa, before deciding to sign with East Bengal for the next season, striking a hat-trick in a 4–1 win over Hindustan Aeronautics.

After a short stint in Poland, Okoro rejoined East Bengal in 2005 despite interest from Dempo and Mahindra United months earlier. Skipping the Red & Gold Brigade's encounter away to JCT to renew his Polish citizenship in February 2006, the club reportedly owed Okoro 130000 Rupees when he visited Poland for citizenship reasons. This amount was eventually given to him despite them originally saying that he in fact owed them 334000 Rupees.

Throughout his career, the Nigerian has been committed a series of transgressions, including pushing the referee in 2003 slapping a different referee while with Mohammedan in 2008 for "asking uncomfortable questions", and breaching contract regulations by exchanging teams mid-season despite signing a one-year contract with Mohammedan in 2007.

== Personal life ==
His baby, Juliette, died in 2005, the same year she was born. With his Irish girlfriend Barbara, the striker took the educational responsibility of an orphan girl, who was then four years old.

== Honours ==
Amica Wronki II

- Polish Cup (Poznań regionals): 2000–01

East Bengal

- National Football League: 2002–03, 2003–04
- ASEAN Club Championship: 2003
