= Raman Vijayan =

Indian footballer and manager

Personal information
- Full name: Raman Vijayan
- Date of birth: 4 June 1973 (age 53)
- Place of birth: Kandramanickam, Sivaganga, Tamil Nadu, India
- Height: 1.88 m (6 ft 2 in)
- Position: Striker

Team information
- Current team: Gokulam Kerala Women (head coach)

Senior career*
Years	Team	Apps	(Gls)
1996-1997	East Bengal		
1997–1998	Kochin	18	(10)
1998–1999	East Bengal	29	(14)
2000–2001	Mahindra United	25	(7)
2001–2002	Dempo	12	(1)
2002–2003	East Bengal	1	(0)
2004–2005	Mohammedan	36	(15)

International career
1996–2001	India	30	(7)

Managerial career
- 2012: Delhi Dynamos
- 2012–2014: South United
- 2015: Chennai
- 2015–2016: Delhi Dynamos (assistant coach)
- 2017–2018: Chennai United
- 2023–2025: Chennaiyin
- 2025–: Gokulam Kerala Women
- * Club domestic league appearances and goals

Raman Vijayan (born 4 June 1973) is an Indian football coach and former footballer. He is the founder of Noble Football Academy and Raman Vijayan Soccer School. He is currently serving as the head coach of the Indian Women's League club Gokulam Kerala.

Raman is one of two Indian footballers, the other being Baichung Bhutia, to be the top scorer in the old National Football League after he scored 10 goals during the 1997–98 season.

== Club career ==
Raman started his footballing career with East Bengal FC before the National Football League began in 1996. After the 1997-98 season, Raman became the top scorer in the NFL that season after he scored 10 goals.

Later in his career, he went on to play for CPT in the Calcutta Football League.

== International ==
Raman has represented the India national football team during his playing career.

== Coaching career ==
For the 2012 I-League 2nd Division Raman was hired to coach Bangalore side KGF Academy.

After coaching South United, Vijayan went back to Tamil Nadu to coach Chennai FC.

In July 2015, it was announced that Vijayan would become the assistant coach at Indian Super League side Delhi Dynamos. He would also be the technical director of the team's grassroots program.

== Honours ==
India

- SAFF Championship: 1997
- South Asian Games Bronze medal: 1999

Bengal

- Santosh Trophy: 1996–97, 1998–99

East Bengal

- Federation Cup: 1996

Individual

- National Football League (India) Golden Boot: 1997–98
