= 2003 ASEAN Club Championship =

First edition of the ASEAN Club Championship

Tournament details
- Host country: Indonesia
- Dates: 13–26 July
- Teams: 11 (from 1 confederation)
- Venues: 2 (in 2 host cities)

Final positions
- Champions: (India) East Bengal (1st title)
- Runners-up: (Thailand) BEC Tero Sasana
- Third place: (Indonesia) Petrokimia Putra

Tournament statistics
- Matches played: 17
- Goals scored: 59 (3.47 per match)
- Top scorer: (India) Baichung Bhutia (East Bengal) (9 goals)
- Best player: (Thailand) Therdsak Chaiman (BEC Tero Sasana)
- Best goalkeeper: (India) Sandip Nandy (East Bengal)
- Fair play award: (Malaysia) Perak

The 2003 ASEAN Club Championship or the 2003 ACC was the first edition of the ASEAN Club Championship, an international football competition between domestic champion clubs sides affiliated with the member associations of the ASEAN Football Federation. It was held in Indonesia, whereas originally it was to be hosted by Vietnam.

East Bengal from India, who were an invited club, were crowned the inaugural champions. It was only time that a non-ASEAN side had won the title.

== Association team allocation ==
Participation for 2003 ACC
Participating ASEAN member
Invited nation

Football association	Group stage
Indonesia	2
Malaysia	1
Thailand	1
Vietnam	1
Singapore	1
Brunei	1
Cambodia	1
Myanmar	1
Laos	1
Philippines	1
India	1

== Teams ==
Location of the 2003 ASEAN Club Championship clubs

Team	Qualification
(Indonesia) Petrokimia Putra	Liga Indonesia 2002 champions (Hosts)
(Cambodia) Samart United	Cambodian League 2002 champions
(Myanmar) Finance and Revenue	Myanmar Premier League 2002 champions
(Malaysia) Perak	2002 Malaysian Premier 1 League champions
Singapore Armed Forces	S. League 2002 champions
(Brunei) DPMM FC	Brunei Premier League 2002 champions
(Indonesia) Persita Tangerang	Liga Indonesia 2002 runners-up
(Vietnam) Hoàng Anh Gia Lai	2003 V-League champions
(Laos) MCTPC	Lao League 2002 champions
(Thailand) BEC Tero Sasana	2001–02 Thai League champions
(Philippines) Philippine Army	Philippines National Football League 2002 champions
(India) East Bengal	National Football League 2002–03 champions (Invited club)

Invited club

Notes

1. Myanmar: Withdrew from the competition before it commenced

== Group stage ==
=== Group A ===
Team	Pld	W	D	L	GF	GA	GD	Pts	Qualification
(Indonesia) Petrokimia Putra	1	1	0	0	2	0	+2	3	
(Cambodia) Samart United	1	0	0	1	0	2	−2	0	
(Myanmar) Finance and Revenue (W)	0	0	0	0	0	0	0	0	Withdrew from the competition before it commenced

Source: RSSSF
(W) Withdrew
13 July 2003

Samart United (Cambodia)	0–2	(Indonesia) Petrokimia Putra
		Costa 54'; Fernando 69'

Petrokimia Stadium, Gresik

=== Group B ===
Team	Pld	W	D	L	GF	GA	GD	Pts
(Malaysia) Perak	2	2	0	0	5	0	+5	6
Singapore Armed Forces	2	0	1	1	2	4	−2	1
(Brunei) DPMM FC	2	0	1	1	2	5	−3	1

Source: RSSSF
13 July 2003

Singapore Armed Forces	0–2	(Malaysia) Perak
		Indra Putra Mahayuddin 20'; Frank Seator 90'

Petrokimia Stadium, Gresik

15 July 2003

Perak (Malaysia)	3–0	(Brunei) DPMM FC
Frank Seator 52' (pen.); Syamsul Saad 71'; Harizul Izuan Rani 90'

Petrokimia Stadium, Gresik

17 July 2003

DPMM FC (Brunei)	2–2	Singapore Armed Forces
Oleseye Ajayi 47'; Hairoddin Abdullah 75'		Mohd Noor Tanjong 88' (o.g.); Nenad Bacina 90'

Petrokimia Stadium, Gresik

=== Group C ===
Team	Pld	W	D	L	GF	GA	GD	Pts
(Indonesia) Persita Tangerang	2	2	0	0	7	2	+5	6
(Vietnam) Hoàng Anh Gia Lai	2	1	0	1	3	3	0	3
(Laos) MCTPC	2	0	0	2	2	7	−5	0

Source: RSSSF
14 July 2003

Persita Tangerang (Indonesia)	2–1	(Vietnam) Hoàng Anh Gia Lai
Ilham Jaya Kesuma 24'; Anthony Jomah Ballah 47'		Kiatisuk Senamuang 10'

Gelora Bung Karno Stadium, Jakarta

16 July 2003

Hoàng Anh Gia Lai (Vietnam)	2–1	(Laos) MCTPC
Kiatisuk Senamuang 6'; Nguyễn Minh Hải 63'		Bounlap Khenkitisack 85'

Gelora Bung Karno Stadium, Jakarta

18 July 2003

MCTPC (Laos)	1–5	(Indonesia) Persita Tangerang
Vanhnaseng Nakhady 90'		Zaenal Arief 23', 36', 44', 80'; Deddy Djunaidi 85'

Gelora Bung Karno Stadium, Jakarta

=== Group D ===
Team	Pld	W	D	L	GF	GA	GD	Pts
(Thailand) BEC Tero Sasana	2	2	0	0	4	0	+4	6
(India) East Bengal	2	1	0	1	6	1	+5	3
(Philippines) Philippine Army	2	0	0	2	0	9	−9	0

Source: RSSSF
14 July 2003

BEC Tero Sasana (Thailand)	1–0	(India) East Bengal
Chaiman 85'	Report

Gelora Bung Karno Stadium, Jakarta

16 July 2003

East Bengal (India)	6–0	(Philippines) Philippine Army
Bhutia 20' (pen.), 22', 50', 53', 70'; Gawli 75' (pen.)	Report

Gelora Bung Karno Stadium, Jakarta
Referee: Jimmy Napitupulu

18 July 2003

Philippine Army (Philippines)	0–3	(Thailand) BEC Tero Sasana
		Yongant 61', 81'; Chaiman 82'

Gelora Bung Karno Stadium, Jakarta

== Knockout stage ==
=== Bracket ===
Quarter-Finals
20 July
(Indonesia) Petrokimia Putra (a.e.t.)	3
Singapore AF	2
21 July
(Indonesia) Persita Tangerang	1
(India) East Bengal	2
20 July 2003
(Malaysia) Perak	2
(Cambodia) Samart United	0
21 July
(Thailand) BEC Tero Sasana	2
(Vietnam) Hoàng Anh Gia Lai	1

Semi-Finals
24 July
(Indonesia) Petrokimia Putra	1 (6)
(India) East Bengal (p)	1 (7)
24 July
(Malaysia) Perak	1
(Thailand) BEC Tero Sasana	3

Final
26 July
(India) East Bengal	3
(Thailand) BEC Tero Sasana	1
Third place
26 July
(Indonesia) Petrokimia Putra	3
(Malaysia) Perak	0

=== Quarter-finals ===
20 July 2003

Petrokimia Putra (Indonesia)	3–2 (a.e.t.)	Singapore Armed Forces
Costa 45'; Budi 58'; Fernando 113'		Jeyapal 9', 22'

20 July 2003

Persita Tangerang (Indonesia)	1–2	(India) East Bengal
Jayakesuma 66' (pen.)	Report	Bhutia 54'; B.Singh 77'

21 July 2003

Perak (Malaysia)	2–0	(Cambodia) Samart United
Seator 18', 23'

21 July 2003

BEC Tero Sasana (Thailand)	2–1	(Vietnam) Hoàng Anh Gia Lai
Chaiman 3' (pen.); Thongsukh 12'		Vượng 39'

=== Semifinals ===
24 July 2003

Petrokimia Putra (Indonesia)	1–1 (a.e.t.)	(India) East Bengal
Ichwan 23'	Report	Bhutia 58'
Penalties
Jaenal Ichwan (penalty scored); Indraju (penalty scored); Pdudu Putra (penalty scored); Fernando (penalty scored); Sasi Kirono (penalty missed); Chan Jhe (penalty scored); Ekwe (penalty scored); Loko (penalty missed)	6–7	(penalty scored) Bhutia; (penalty scored) B. Singh; (penalty scored) Musah; (penalty missed) Malswama; (penalty scored) Chandan Das; (penalty scored) Silva; (penalty scored) I. S. Singh; (penalty scored) Suresh

24 July 2003

Perak (Malaysia)	1–3	(Thailand) BEC Tero Sasana
Frank Seator 49'		Anucha Kitpongsri 55'; Therdsak Chaiman 61'; Jatupong Thongsukh 67'

=== 3rd place playoff ===
26 July 2003

Petrokimia Putra (Indonesia)	3–0	(Malaysia) Perak
Rivaldo Costa 35'; Jaenal Ichwan 66', 69'

=== Final ===
26 July 2003

East Bengal (India)	3–1	(Thailand) BEC Tero Sasana
Okoro 28'; Bhutia 47'; D'Cunha 68'	Report	Panai Kongprapun 58'

Gelora Bung Karno Stadium, Jakarta
Referee: Jimmy Napitupulu (Indonesia)

== Top scorers ==
Rank	Player	Club	Goals
1	(India) Baichung Bhutia	(India) East Bengal	9
2	(Liberia) Frank Seator	(Malaysia) Perak	5
3	(Indonesia) Zaenal Arief	(Indonesia) Persita Tangerang	4
3	(Thailand) Therdsak Chaiman	(Thailand) BEC Tero Sasana	4
5	(Brazil) Rivaldo Costa	(Indonesia) Petrokimia Putra	3
5	(Indonesia) Jaenal Ichwan	(Indonesia) Petrokimia Putra	3
7	(Thailand) Wuttiya Yongant	(Thailand) BEC Tero Sasana	2
7	(Thailand) Jatupong Thongsuk	(Thailand) BEC Tero Sasana	2
7	(Brazil) Danilo Fernando	(Indonesia) Petrokimia Putra	2
7	(Singapore) Jeyakanth Jeyapal	Singapore Armed Forces	2
7	(Indonesia) Ilham Jaya Kesuma	(Indonesia) Persita Tangerang	2
7	(Thailand) Kiatisuk Senamuang	(Vietnam) Hoàng Anh Gia Lai	2
