= Sangram Mukherjee =

Indian footballer (born 1981)

Personal information
- Full name: Sangram Mukherjee
- Date of birth: 6 November 1981 (age 44)
- Place of birth: Kolkata, India
- Height: 1.82 m (5 ft 11 1/2 in)
- Position: Goalkeeper

Youth career
- 1996–1999: TFA

Senior career*
Years	Team	Apps	(Gls)
1999–2005	East Bengal		
2005–2006	Salgaocar		
2006–2011	Mohun Bagan		

International career
2002	India U23		
2002–2004	India	8	(0)
- * Club domestic league appearances and goals as of 6 December 2013

Sangram Mukherjee (born 1981) is a retired Indian professional footballer. Born and raised in Kanchrapara, Mukherjee achieved fame during playing for Mohun Bagan AC. He last played for Southern Samity in the Calcutta Football League.

== International career ==
Sangram has been capped at senior level for the India national football team.

== Honours ==
East Bengal

- IFA Shield: 2000, 2002

India U23

- LG Cup: 2002

India

- Afro-Asian Games silver medal: 2003
