= Tushar Rakshit =

Indian footballer and coach

Personal information
- Full name: Tushar Rakshit
- Date of birth: 4 February 1968 (age 58)
- Place of birth: West Bengal, India
- Position: Midfielder

Senior career*
Years	Team	Apps	(Gls)
- Wari
- East Bengal

International career
- India
- * Club domestic league appearances and goals

Tushar Rakshit is a former Indian professional footballer and former Assistant Coach at East Bengal FC. He was appointed to this role in August 2009. Tiash Rakshit is his son. Tushar is an ex-India international, and as a player has represented East Bengal FC continuously for fourteen seasons. He also appeared with Eastern Railway. He spent his earlier career in Russa United Club in Tollygunge.

== Honours ==
India

- SAFF Championship: 1997

East Bengal

- Federation Cup: 1996
- IFA Shield: 2000
