= Subhash Bhowmick =

Indian footballer and coach (1950–2022)

Personal information
- Date of birth: 2 October 1950
- Place of birth: Malda, West Bengal, India
- Date of death: 22 January 2022 (aged 71)
- Place of death: Kolkata, West Bengal, India
- Position: Striker

Senior career*
Years	Team	Apps	(Gls)
1969–1970	East Bengal		(13)
1970–1973	Mohun Bagan	60	(50)
1973–1976	East Bengal		(68)
1976–1978	Mohun Bagan	45	(35)
1979	East Bengal		(1)

International career
1970–1985	India	24	(9)

Managerial career
- George Telegraph
- 1999–2000: East Bengal
- 2002–2005: East Bengal
- 2006: Mohammedan
- 2007–2008: Salgaocar
- 2008–2009: East Bengal
- 2010–2011: Mohun Bagan
- 2012–2013: Churchill Brothers (technical director)
- 2014: Mohun Bagan
Medal record
Men's football
Representing India
Asian Games
Bronze medal – third place	1970 Bangkok	Team
- * Club domestic league appearances and goals

Subhash Bhowmick (2 October 1950 – 22 January 2022) was an Indian football player and manager. During his playing career, he represented the "Big Two" of Kolkata football, East Bengal and Mohun Bagan. He also represented India in various international tournaments between 1970 and 1985.

He was popularly known as Bhombol in the football arena of the West Bengal. He also served as technical director of Mohun Bagan. Bhowmick was an honorary member of the Calcutta Cricket and Football Club.

== Club career ==
Bhowmick joined East Bengal Club in 1969 and, after spending a season there, joined Mohun Bagan in 1970. He was part of the club's Bangladesh tour of May 1972, where they defeated Dhaka Mohammedan, but lost to Shadhin Bangla football team. At the end of the 1973 season, he returned to East Bengal and represented them till 1976, after which he rejoined Mohun Bagan. In East Bengal, he got guidance of coach Sushil Bhattacharya.

He was one of the prime faces of East Bengal team which had demolished Mohun Bagan 5–0 in the 1975 IFA Shield final at Calcutta. After the 1977–78 season, he returned to East Bengal and retired in 1979. During his playing years, he was known as a powerful forward with good goal scoring abilities. He scored 83 goals for East Bengal and 82 for the Mohun Bagan between 1969 and 1977 as Kolkata football's popularity was at its peak during that era.

== International career ==
Bhowmick represented India in various tournaments. He was a member of the Indian football team managed by P. K. Banerjee, that won the bronze medal in the Asian Games in 1970. in Bangkok, Thailand. He also represented India at the Merdeka Tournament, and won Pesta Sukan Cup in 1971.

== Coaching career ==
Bhowmick began his coaching career in Calcutta Football League club George Telegraph. Since joining East Bengal in 1999, he came out as one of the most successful coaches in the history of the club. He had a forgettable first stint with the same club during the 1999–2000 season. During his second stint as coach, the club won a multitude of trophies including back to back NFL titles in 2002–03 and 2003–04, apart from Kolkata Football League, Durand Cup and IFA Shield victories. East Bengal also won the ASEAN Club Championship in Indonesia in 2003 under his managership. Bhowmick stepped down as coach of East Bengal in 2005 after being implicated in an alleged bribery scandal.

He managed Mohammedan Sporting Club during the 2006 season, but was not as successful there as he was during his stint with East Bengal. In 2007, a relegation threatened Salgaocar SC appointed Subhash Bhowmick to be their technical director. He remained as the Technical Director of the Goan outfit for the 2008 season also. Towards the end of the 2008–09 I-League, a relegation threatened East Bengal Club appointed Bhowmick as their coach. He was retained as coach for the 2009–10 season, a particularly dismal season for the club. East Bengal lost all the matches they played, most of them against smaller clubs, in both the IFA Shield as well as the Durand Cup. Supporters and club officials fixed the blame squarely on Bhowmick, as he was essentially the only man responsible for team making and pre-season training for the 2009–10 season. Despite significant autonomy granted to Bhowmick by East Bengal administrators, as well as provision of extra training facilities, his team failed to perform.

In the 2012–13 season, he coached Goan side Churchill Brothers SC as a technical director (as he did not hold an A-license, hence he could not officially be the coach of an I-League club), and led them to the top of the league standings in the I-League.

== Controversy ==
On 2 December 2005, near Calcutta South Club, Bhowmick was caught red handed and arrested by the police for bribery case. Bhowmick was a superintendent of Central Excise and alleged to have accepted bribe of Rs 1.5 lakh from a businessman. According to the Central Bureau of Investigation (CBI), he had demanded the money from a Behala based businessman to settle his issue. In June 2018, the CBI Court found him guilty and sentenced Bhowmick to three years imprisonment. His career was also marred after the Corruption controversy.

== Death ==
Bhowmick died in Ekbalpur on 22 January 2022, at the age of 71. He suffered from diabetes and kidney ailments prior to his death.

== Legacy ==
In July 2022, Mohun Bagan announced the club awards have been named after famous personalities to be awarded to sportspersons every year henceforth, and "Best Forward Award" was renamed as Subhash Bhowmick Award in memory of him; which was won by Kiyan Nassiri.

== Honours ==
=== As player ===
India

- Asian Games Bronze medal: 1970
- Merdeka Tournament Third place: 1970
- Pesta Sukan Cup: 1971

Bengal

- Santosh Trophy: 1969, 1971, 1972, 1975

East Bengal

- Calcutta Football League: 1973, 1974, 1975
- IFA Shield: 1973, 1974, 1975
- Rovers Cup: 1969, 1970, 1971, 1972, 1973
- DCM Trophy: 1973, 1974

Mohun Bagan

- Calcutta Football League: 1976, 1978
- IFA Shield: 1976, 1977, 1978
- Durand Cup: 1977
- Indian Federation Cup: 1978
- Rovers Cup: 1970, 1971,1972,1976, 1977
- Bordoloi Trophy: 1976, 1977
- Darjeeling Gold Cup: 1976
- Sait Nagjee Trophy: 1978

=== As manager ===
Bengal

- Santosh Trophy: 1986–87

East Bengal

- ASEAN Club Championship: 2003
- National Football League: 2002–03, 2003–04
- San Miguel International Cup: 2004
- Indian Super Cup: 2006
- Durand Cup: 2002, 2004
- IFA Shield: 2000, 2001, 2002
- Calcutta Football League: 2000, 2002, 2003, 2004, 2006

Churchill Brothers

- I-League: 2012–13

=== Individual ===
- East Bengal "Lifetime Achievement Award": 2017
- IndianFootball.com Awards —Coach of the Year: 2003

== See also ==
- List of India national football team hat-tricks
- List of East Bengal Club coaches

== Bibliography ==
- Roy, Gautam (1 January 2021). East Bengal 100. Allsport Foundation. ISBN 978-8194763109.
- Majumdar, Boria; Bandyopadhyay, Kausik (2006). A Social History Of Indian Football: Striving To Score. Routledge. ISBN 9780415348355. Archived from the original on 29 June 2021.
- Basu, Jaydeep (2003). Stories from Indian Football. UBS Publishers' Distributors. ISBN 9788174764546. Archived from the original on 11 October 2022.
- Kapadia, Novy (2017). Barefoot to Boots: The Many Lives of Indian Football. Penguin Random House. ISBN 978-0-143-42641-7.
- Martinez, Dolores; Mukharjiim, Projit B (2009). Football: From England to the World: The Many Lives of Indian Football. Routledge. ISBN 978-1-138-88353-6. Archived from the original on 2 July 2022.
- Dineo, Paul; Mills, James (2001). Soccer in South Asia: Empire, Nation, Diaspora. London, United Kingdom: Frank Cass Publishers. p. 33. ISBN 978-0-7146-8170-2. Archived from the original on 25 July 2022.
- Nath, Nirmal (2011). History of Indian Football: Upto 2009–10. Readers Service. ISBN 9788187891963. Archived from the original on 22 July 2022.
- Chattopadhyay, Hariprasad (2017). Mohun Bagan–East Bengal (in Bengali). Kolkata: Parul Prakashan.
