= 2002–03 National Football League (India) =

7th season of National Football League

National Football League
- Season: 2002–03
- Dates: 15 November 2002 – 28 April 2003
- Champions: East Bengal; 2nd NFL title 2nd Indian title
- Runner up: Salgaocar
- Relegated: Hindustan Aeronautics Limited; Indian Telephone Industries
- AFC Cup: East Bengal; Mahindra United
- Matches: 132
- Top goalscorer: Yusif Yakubu (21 goals)
- Biggest home win: Vasco 8–0 HAL

The 2002–03 Indian National Football League, also known as the Oil PSU National Football League for sponsorship reasons, was the seventh season of National Football League, the top Indian league for association football clubs, since its inception in 1996. The season began on 17 November 2002 and concluded on 28 April 2003. East Bengal won the title, their second, with a game to spare.

== Overview ==
It was contested by 12 teams, Dempo and Indian Bank were promoted from NFL 2. East Bengal won the championship under the coach Subhas Bhowmick and this was their second title. Salgaonkar came second and Vasco again came third. HAL (Hindustan Aeronautics Limited) and ITI (Indian Telephone Industries) were relegated from the National Football League next season.

== League standings ==
Locations of teams in the 2002–03 National Football League

Pos	Team	Pld	W	D	L	GF	GA	GD	Pts
1	East Bengal (C)	22	15	4	3	44	22	+22	49
2	Salgaocar	22	13	5	4	43	17	+26	44
3	Vasco	22	12	7	3	40	21	+19	43
4	JCT Mills	22	11	5	6	34	21	+13	38
5	Churchill Brothers	22	10	7	5	33	22	+11	37
6	Dempo	22	10	5	7	34	29	+5	35
7	Mohun Bagan	22	9	6	7	35	25	+10	33
8	Mahindra United	22	7	5	10	27	30	−3	26
9	Tollygunge Agragami	22	6	5	11	29	38	−9	23
10	Indian Bank	22	6	2	14	31	53	−22	20
11	Hindustan Aeronautics Limited (R)	22	3	2	17	17	54	−37	11
12	Indian Telephone Industries (R)	22	1	5	16	14	49	−35	8

Source: rsssf.com
(C) Champions; (R) Relegated
