= List of Indian football champions =

Champions of India
List of Indian football champions
- National Football League (1996–2007)
- I-League (2007–2017)
- I-League & Indian Super League (2017–2022)
- Indian Super League (2022–present)

Country
- India

Founded
- 1996

Number of teams
- 14

Current champions
- East Bengal (4th title) (2025–26)

Most successful club(s)
- Mohun Bagan (7 titles)

The Indian football champions are the winners of the highest tier of the Indian football league system, currently the Indian Super League.

Though Indian football tournaments date back to the eighteenth century, a proper league system, the National Football League (NFL) was established in 1996–97. After the 2006–07 season, the NFL was rebranded, becoming the I-League with its champions continuing to be considered national champions until 2017, when the Indian Super League (ISL) became the country's joint premier football league. In 2022, ISL became the only top-tier football league of the country. ISL playoffs winners were considered as ISL champions until 2021–22 season. From 2022–23 season, ISL champions designation was awarded to the table toppers.

There are 12 clubs who have won either the National Football League or the I-League, and six clubs who have won the Indian Super League. JCT were the first club to have won any championship, winning the 1996–97 NFL. Mohun Bagan are the most successful club, winning championships five times, NFL three times and I-League twice.

== History ==
The first Indian football league, the National Football League (NFL) was an association football league competition in India which was organised into three divisions. The Premier Division of the league was first introduced in 1996, though the country already had a long history in the sport thanks to the likes of the IFA Shield and the Federation Cup. The league though is now transformed into the I-League and continues with that name. The change was supposed to bring more popularity to Indian Football. The first league season of I-League consisted of eight teams from the NFL plus two promoted teams from the former Division Two.

The 1996–97 Indian National Football League was the first season of the NFL and ended with JCT Mills FC being crowned champions. The NFL era though saw Kolkata clubs East Bengal and Mohun Bagan had the most championships with three respectively. The I-League era is different though as most of the champions of the league have come from Goa.

Currently, the team with the most championships in I-League is Dempo who have won three championships in the league.

In 2014, a new football league named Indian Super League has started. In its first three seasons it was running without recognition from the AFC. Before 2017–18 season, ISL got recognition from Asian Football Confederation (AFC). In July 2017, it was proposed by the All India Football Federation (AIFF) that the Indian Super League champion be granted a spot in the AFC Cup, Asia's second-tier club competition. On 25 July 2017, the AFC approved the AIFF's proposal. Thus, from the 2017–18 season, the Indian Super League champions were allowed to participate in the AFC Cup from the qualification stages of the competition. Meanwhile, India's spot in the AFC Champions League, Asia's top club competition, was still kept by the I-League; thus two leagues were parallelly running in the country. In October 2019, a roadmap for development of league in India was proposed. All stakeholders accepted the proposal where it was announced that ISL premiers would now be entitled to the AFC Champions League, starting from 2021 edition and the I-League champion will get to play the AFC Cup. From 2022 to 2023 season the AFC Cup slot from I-League has been transferred to Super Cup and ISL became the only top tier League in India.

== List of champions by season ==
=== National Football League (1996–2007) ===
Key

†	Winning team won the Double (League title and Federation Cup)

Ed.	Season	Champions (titles)	Runners-up	Third place	Head coach	Top scorer(s) (club)	Goals
1	1996–97	JCT	Churchill Brothers	East Bengal	(India) Sukhwinder Singh	(India) Bhaichung Bhutia (JCT)	14
2	1997–98	Mohun Bagan	East Bengal	Salgaocar	(India) T. K. Chathunni	(India) Raman Vijayan (FC Kochin)	10
3	1998–99	Salgaocar	East Bengal	Churchill Brothers	(India) Shabbir Ali	(Ghana) Philip Mensah (Churchill Brothers)	11
4	1999–2000	Mohun Bagan	Churchill Brothers	Salgaocar	(India) Subrata Bhattacharya	(Uzbekistan) Igor Shkvyrin (Mohun Bagan)	11
5	2000–01	East Bengal	Mohun Bagan	Churchill Brothers	(India) Monoranjan Bhattacharya	(Brazil) José Barreto (Mohun Bagan)	14
6	2001–02	Mohun Bagan †	Churchill Brothers	Vasco	(India) Subrata Bhattacharya	(Ghana) Yusif Yakubu (Churchill Brothers)	18
7	2002–03	East Bengal	Salgaocar	Vasco	(India) Subhash Bhowmick	(Ghana) Yusif Yakubu (Churchill Brothers)	21
8	2003–04	East Bengal	Dempo	Mahindra United	(India) Subhash Bhowmick	(Brazil) Cristiano Júnior (East Bengal)	15
9	2004–05	Dempo †	Sporting Goa	East Bengal	(India) Armando Colaco	(Nigeria) Dudu Omagbemi (Spoting Goa)	21
10	2005–06	Mahindra United †	East Bengal	Mohun Bagan	(India) Derrick Pereira	(Nigeria) Ranti Martins (Dempo)	13
11	2006–07	Dempo	JCT	Mahindra United	(India) Armando Colaco	(Nigeria) Odafa Okolie (Churchill Brothers)	18

=== I-League (2007–2017) ===
Ed.	Season	Champions (titles)	Runners-up	Third place	Head coach	Top scorer(s) (club)	Goals
12	2007–08	Dempo	Churchill Brothers	JCT	(India) Armando Colaco	(Nigeria) Odafa Okolie (Churchill Brothers)	22
13	2008–09	Churchill Brothers	Mohun Bagan	Sporting Goa	(Serbia) Zoran Đorđević	(Nigeria) Odafa Okolie (Churchill Brothers)	24
14	2009–10	Dempo	Churchill Brothers	Pune	(India) Armando Colaco	(Nigeria) Odafa Okolie (Churchill Brothers)	21
15	2010–11	Salgaocar	East Bengal	Dempo	(Morocco) Karim Bencherifa	(Nigeria) Ranti Martins (Dempo)	28
16	2011–12	Dempo	East Bengal	Churchill Brothers	(India) Armando Colaco	(Nigeria) Ranti Martins (Dempo)	32
17	2012–13	Churchill Brothers	Pune	East Bengal	(India) Mariano Dias	(Nigeria) Ranti Martins (Prayag United)	26
18	2013–14	Bengaluru	East Bengal	Salgaocar	(England) Ashley Westwood	(Trinidad and Tobago) Cornell Glen (Shillong Lajong) (Scotland) Darryl Duffy (Salgaocar) (India) Sunil Chhetri (Bengaluru)	14
19	2014–15	Mohun Bagan	Bengaluru	Royal Wahingdoh	(India) Sanjoy Sen	(Nigeria) Ranti Martins (East Bengal)	17
20	2015–16	Bengaluru	Mohun Bagan	East Bengal	(England) Ashley Westwood	(Nigeria) Ranti Martins (East Bengal)	12
21	2016–17	Aizawl	Mohun Bagan	East Bengal	(India) Khalid Jamil	(Cameroon) Aser Dipanda (Shillong Lajong)	11

=== I-League and Indian Super League (2017–2022) ===
From the 2017–18 season until the 2021–22 season, the I-League and the Indian Super League shared joint top-tier status in the Indian football league system.

==== I-League ====
Ed.	Season	Champions (titles)	Runners-up	Third place	Head coach	Top scorer(s) (club)	Goals
22	2017–18	Minerva Punjab	NEROCA	Mohun Bagan	(India) Khogen Singh	(Cameroon) Aser Dipanda (Mohun Bagan)	13
23	2018–19	Chennai City	East Bengal	Real Kashmir	(Singapore) Akbar Nawas	(Spain) Pedro Manzi (Chennai City) (Trinidad and Tobago) Willis Plaza (Churchill Brothers)	21
24	2019–20	Mohun Bagan	Not awarded (Note: On 18 April 2020, the AIFF announced Mohun Bagan as champions and decided to cancel the remaining matches due to the COVID-19 pandemic.)		(Spain) Kibu Vicuña	(Cameroon) Aser Dipanda (Punjab)	12
25	2020–21	Gokulam Kerala	Churchill Brothers	TRAU	(Italy) Vincenzo Annese	(India) Bidyashagar Singh (TRAU)	12
26	2021–22	Gokulam Kerala	Mohammedan	Sreenidi Deccan	(Italy) Vincenzo Annese	(Trinidad and Tobago) Marcus Joseph (Mohammedan)	16

==== Indian Super League ====
Until the 2021–22 season, the winners of the Indian Super League playoffs final were awarded the championship title.

Ed.	Season	Champions (titles)	Score	Runners-up	Head coach	Top scorer(s) (club)	Goals
22	2017–18	Chennaiyin (Note: ATK won in 2014 and 2016, and Chennaiyin won in 2015, prior to the 2017–18 season when ISL attained top-division status.)	3–2	Bengaluru	(England) John Gregory	(Spain) Coro (Goa)	18
23	2018–19	Bengaluru	1–0	Goa	(Spain) Carles Cuadrat	(Spain) Coro (Goa)	16
24	2019–20	ATK	3–1	Chennaiyin	(Spain) Antonio López	(Fiji) Roy Krishna (ATK) (Lithuania) Nerijus Valskis (Chennaiyin) (Nigeria) Bartholomew Ogbeche (Kerala Blasters)	15
25	2020–21	Mumbai City	2–1	Mohun Bagan	(Spain) Sergio Lobera	(Spain) Igor Angulo (Goa) (Fiji) Roy Krishna (Mohun Bagan)	14
26	2021–22	Hyderabad	1–1 (a.e.t.); 3–1 (p)	Kerala Blasters	(Spain) Manolo Márquez	(Nigeria) Bartholomew Ogbeche (Hyderabad)	18

=== Indian Super League (2022–present) ===
Ed.	Season	Champions (titles)	Runners-up	Third place	Head coach	Top scorer(s) (club)	Goals
27	2022–23	Mumbai City	Hyderabad	Mohun Bagan	(England) Des Buckingham	(Brazil) Diego Maurício (Odisha) (Brazil) Cleiton Silva (East Bengal) (Australia) Dimitri Petratos (Mohun Bagan	12
28	2023–24	Mohun Bagan	Mumbai City	Goa	(Spain) Antonio López	(Greece) Dimitrios Diamantakos (Kerala Blasters) (Fiji) Roy Krishna (Odisha)	13
29	2024–25	Mohun Bagan	FC Goa	Bengaluru	(Spain) José Molina	(Morocco) Alaaeddine Ajaraie (NorthEast United)	23
30	2025–26	East Bengal	Mohun Bagan	Mumbai City	(Spain) Óscar Bruzón	(Spain) Youssef Ezzejjari (East Bengal)	11

== Performances ==
Sixteen clubs have won India's top-tier league title. Six clubs won the National Football League, six clubs won the I-League, and six clubs have won the Indian Super League. From the 2017–18 season until the 2021–22 season, the I-League and Indian Super League shared joint top-tier status in the Indian football league system.

=== Performance by club ===
Clubs in bold currently play in the top-tier.
Clubs in italics with a † are no longer in existence.

Rank	Club	Winners	Runners-up	Winning seasons	Runners-up seasons
1	**Mohun Bagan**	7	6	1997–98, 1999–2000, 2001–02, 2014–15, 2019–20, 2023–24, 2024–25	2000–01, 2008–09, 2015–16, 2016–17, 2020–21, 2025–26
2	Dempo	5	1	2004–05, 2006–07, 2007–08, 2009–10, 2011–12	2003–04
3	**East Bengal**	4	7	2000–01, 2002–03, 2003–04, 2025–26	1997–98, 1998–99, 2005–06, 2010–11, 2011–12, 2013–14, 2018–19
4	**Bengaluru**	3	2	2013–14, 2015–16, 2018–19	2014–15, 2017–18
5	**Churchill Brothers**	2	6	2008–09, 2012–13	1996–97, 1999–2000, 2001–02, 2007–08, 2009–10, 2020–21
5	Salgaocar † (Note: Salgaocar have disbanded their senior team and are currently operating the youth teams.)	2	1	1998–99, 2010–11	2002–03
5	**Mumbai City**	2	1	2020–21, 2022–23	2023–24
5	Gokulam Kerala	2	0	2020–21, 2021–22	—
9	JCT †	1	1	1996–97	2006–07
9	**Chennaiyin**	1	1	2017–18	2019–20
9	Hyderabad † (Note: Hyderabad got rebranded to SC Delhi after shifting their base to Delhi)	1	1	2021–22	2022–23
9	Mahindra United †	1	0	2005–06	—
9	Aizawl	1	0	2016–17	—
9	Minerva Punjab † (Note: MInerva Punjab was sold to Roundglass Sports and became Punjab FC, while Minerva Academy FC is still active.)	1	0	2017–18	—
9	Chennai City †	1	0	2018–19	—
9	ATK † (Note: ATK was merged with the football division of Mohun Bagan to form Mohun Bagan Super Giants after the 2019-20 season.)	1	0	2019–20	—

Titles won by club (%)
1. Mohun Bagan (20.0%)
2. Dempo (14.3%)
3. East Bengal (11.4%)
4. Bengaluru (8.57%)
5. Churchill Brothers (5.71%)
6. Salgaocar (5.71%)
7. Mumbai City (5.71%)
8. Gokulam Kerala (5.71%)
9. JCT (2.86%)
10. Chennaiyin (2.86%)
11. Hyderabad (2.86%)
12. Mahindra United (2.86%)
13. Aizawl (2.86%)
14. Minerva Punjab (2.86%)
15. Chennai City (2.86%)
16. ATK (2.86%)

=== Performance by state ===
State	Championships	Clubs
West Bengal	12	Mohun Bagan (7), East Bengal (4), ATK (1)
Goa	9	Dempo (5), Churchill Brothers (2), Salgaocar (2)
Karnataka	3	Bengaluru (3)
Maharashtra	3	Mumbai City (2), Mahindra United (1)
Punjab	2	JCT (1), Minerva Punjab (1)
Tamil Nadu	2	Chennaiyin (1), Chennai City (1)
Kerala	2	Gokulam Kerala (2)
Mizoram	1	Aizawl (1)
Telangana	1	Hyderabad (1)

=== Performance by city/town ===
City/Town	State	Championships	Clubs
Kolkata	West Bengal	12	Mohun Bagan (7), East Bengal (4), ATK (1)
Panaji	Goa	5	Dempo (5)
Bangalore	Karnataka	3	Bengaluru (3)
Mumbai	Maharashtra	3	Mumbai City (2), Mahindra United (1)
Margao	Goa	2	Churchill Brothers (2)
Vasco da Gama	Goa	2	Salgaocar (2)
Kozhikode	Kerala	2	Gokulam Kerala (2)
Aizawl	Mizoram	1	Aizawl (1)
Chennai	Tamil Nadu	1	Chennaiyin (1)
Coimbatore	Tamil Nadu	1	Chennai City (1)
Hoshiarpur	Punjab	1	JCT (1)
Ludhiana	Punjab	1	Minerva Punjab (1)
Hyderabad	Telangana	1	Hyderabad (1)

=== Performance by region ===
Region	Championships
West	12
East	12
South	8
North	2
Northeast	1

== National Cup winners ==
=== Federation Cup (1977–2017, 2026–present) ===
Year	Winners	Runners-up
1977–78	**Indian Telephone Industries**	Mohun Bagan
1978–79	**Mohun Bagan** and **East Bengal** - (joint winners)	
1979–80	**BSF**	Mafatlal Mills
1980–81	**Mohun Bagan** and **East Bengal** - (joint winners)	
1981–82	**Mohun Bagan**	Mohammedan
1982–83	**Mohun Bagan**	Mafatlal Mills
1983–84	**Mohammedan**	Mohun Bagan
1984–85	**Mohammedan**	East Bengal
1985	**East Bengal**	Mohun Bagan
1986–87	**Mohun Bagan**	East Bengal
1987–88	**Mohun Bagan**	Salgaocar
1988–89	**Salgaocar**	BSF
1989–90	**Salgaocar**	Mohammedan Sporting
1990	**Kerala Police**	Salgaocar
1991	**Kerala Police**	Mahindra & Mahindra
1992	**Mohun Bagan**	East Bengal
1993	**Mohun Bagan**	Mahindra & Mahindra
1994	**Mohun Bagan**	Salgaocar
1995	**JCT**	East Bengal
1995–96	**JCT**	East Bengal
1996	**East Bengal**	Dempo
1997	**Salgaocar**	East Bengal
1998	**Mohun Bagan**	East Bengal
1999	Not held	
2000	Not held	
2001	**Mohun Bagan**	Dempo
2002	Not held	
2003	**Mahindra United**	Mohammedan Sporting
2004	**Dempo**	Mohun Bagan
2005	**Mahindra United**	Sporting Goa
2006	**Mohun Bagan**	Sporting Goa
2007	**East Bengal**	Mahindra United
2008	**Mohun Bagan**	Dempo
2009–10	**East Bengal**	Shillong Lajong
2010	**East Bengal**	Mohun Bagan
2011	**Salgaocar**	East Bengal
2012	**East Bengal**	Dempo
2013–14	**Churchill Brothers**	Sporting Goa
2014–15	**Bengaluru**	Dempo
2015–16	**Mohun Bagan**	Aizawl
2016–17	**Bengaluru**	Mohun Bagan

=== AIFF Super Cup (2018–2025) ===
Season	Winner	Runner-up
2018	**Bengaluru** (3)	East Bengal
2019	**Goa**	Chennaiyin
2020–2022	Tournament suspended due to the COVID-19 pandemic and Indian national team's international fixtures	
2023	**Odisha**	Bengaluru
2024	**East Bengal** (9)	Odisha
2025	**Goa** (2)	Jamshedpur
2025–26	**Goa** (3)	East Bengal

=== Performance by club ===
Key

*	Shared
#	There were two federation cups in 1996

Clubs in bold currently play in the top-tier.

Rank	Club	Winner	Winning Years	Runners-up	Runners-up Years
1	**Mohun Bagan**	14	1978*, 1980*, 1981, 1982, 1986, 1987; 1992, 1993, 1994, 1998; 2001, 2006, 2008, 2016	6	1977, 1983, 1985, 2004, 2010, 2017
2	**East Bengal**	9	1978*, 1980*, 1985, 1996, 2007, 2009–10, 2010, 2012, 2024	10	1984, 1986, 1992, 1995–96, 1996, 1997, 1998, 2011, 2018, 2025–26
3	Salgaocar	4	1988, 1989, 1997, 2011	3	1987, 1990, 1994
4	**Bengaluru**	3	2014–15, 2017, 2018	1	2023
4	**Goa**	3	2019, 2025, 2025–26	0	—
6	Mohammedan	2	1983, 1984	3	1981, 1989, 2003
6	Mahindra United	2	2003, 2005	3	1991, 1993, 2007
6	JCT	2	1995, 1995–96	0	—
6	Kerala Police	2	1990, 1991	0	—
10	Dempo	1	2004	5	1996#, 2001, 2008, 2012, 2014–15
10	Border Security Force	1	1979	1	1988
10	**Odisha**	1	2023	1	2024
10	Indian Telephone Industries	1	1977	0	—
10	Churchill Brothers	1	2013–14	0	—

=== Performance by state ===
State	Championships	Clubs
West Bengal	25	Mohun Bagan (14), East Bengal (9), Mohammedan (2)
Goa	9	Salgaocar (4), Goa (3), Dempo (1), Churchill Brothers (1),
Karnataka	4	Bengaluru (3), Indian Telephone Industries (1)
Punjab	3	JCT (2), Border Security Force (1)
Maharashtra	2	Mahindra United (2),
Kerala	2	Kerala Police (2)
Odisha	1	Odisha (1)

=== Performance by region ===
Region	Championships
East	26
West	11
South	6
North	3

== See also ==
- List of Indian football first tier top scorers
- List of association football competitions
- Super Cup
- Durand Cup
- Indian Football League
- Indian Super League
- Football in India
- List of Indian women's football champions
