= List of Mohun Bagan Super Giant records and statistics =

Mohun Bagan Super Giant (football division of Mohun Bagan Athletic Club) is an Indian association football club based in Kolkata, West Bengal. Founded in 1889, it is one of the oldest football clubs in Asia. The club competes in the Indian Super League, the top tier of Indian football league system.

Mohun Bagan played their first match in 1889 against Eden Hindu Hostel. They won their first ever title in 1904, lifting Cooch Behar Cup. In 1911, Mohun Bagan became the first Indian club to win a major title, when they defeated the East Yorkshire Regiment, 2–1 to lift the IFA Shield. With 14 Federation Cup titles and 7 NFL/I-League/ISL titles, Mohun Bagan is the most successful club in major national tournaments. Mohun bagan have won more than 5000 matches in their football history, which is highest for an Indian club.

== Domestic titles ==
=== National Football League ===
Mohun Bagan is the most successful club with 3 national league titles, along with East Bengal FC, who also has 3 titles.

Winners (3): 1997–98, 1999–2000, 2001–02
Runners-up (1): 2000–01

=== I-League ===
Mohun Bagan has won the I-League twice, winning the first title in 2014–15.

Winners (2): 2014–15, 2019–20
Runners-up (3): 2008–09, 2015-16, 2016-17

=== Indian Super League ===
Mohun Bagan has won an Indian Super League championship title, winning the first title in 2022–23 and won its first premiership title in 2023–24.

- Regular season

Winners (2): 2023–24, 2024–25
Runners-up (2): 2020–21, 2025–26

- Playoffs

Winners (2): 2022–23, 2024–25
Runners-up (2): 2020–21, 2023–24

=== Federation Cup ===
With 14 titles, Mohun Bagan is by far the most successful team in India's most important Cup competition. Mohun Bagan is the only Indian club to have won Federation Cup three consecutive times on two separate occasions.

Winners (14): 1978, 1980, 1981, 1982, 1986, 1987, 1992, 1993, 1994, 1998, 2001, 2006, 2008, 2015–16
Runners-up (6): 1997, 1983, 1985, 2004, 2010, 2016–17

=== Indian Super Cup ===
Mohun Bagan has won the Super Cup twice, winning the first title in 2007.

Winners (2): 2007, 2009
Runners-up (2): 1998, 1999

=== Durand Cup ===
Mohun Bagan is the most successful team in Durand Cup, having won the title 17 times. Mohun Bagan is also the only Indian club to have won Durand Cup three consecutive times on two occasions. They are also the first Indian civilian club to be invited to participate in the Durand Cup.

Winners (17): 1953, 1959, 1960, 1963, 1964, 1965, 1974, 1977, 1979, 1980, 1982, 1984, 1985, 1986, 1994, 2000, 2023
Runners-up (14): 1950, 1961, 1970, 1972, 1978, 1983, 1987, 1989, 1997, 2004, 2009, 2019, 2024, 2026

=== Calcutta Football League ===
Mohun Bagan won the Calcutta Football League for the first time in 1939. The first league title post independence came in 1951. The Mariners have clinched three consecutive league titles three times in their history. Mohun Bagan was the first club to win ten league titles in 1962.

Winners (31): 1939, 1943, 1944, 1951, 1954, 1955, 1956, 1959, 1960, 1962, 1963, 1964, 1965, 1969, 1976, 1978, 1979, 1983, 1984, 1986, 1990, 1992, 1994, 1997, 2001, 2005, 2007, 2008, 2009, 2018, 2026
Runners-up (40): 1916, 1920, 1921, 1925, 1929, 1934, 1940, 1945, 1946, 1948, 1950, 1958, 1966, 1970, 1972, 1973, 1975, 1977, 1981, 1982, 1985, 1987, 1988, 1989, 1991, 1993, 1995, 1996, 1998, 1999, 2000, 2003, 2004, 2006, 2012, 2019

=== IFA Shield ===
In 1911 Mohun Bagan became the first Indian club to win IFA Shield by defeating East Yorkshire Regiment 2–1 in the final. The second IFA Shield title came in 1947. Between 1976 and 1979 the club won IFA Shield four consecutive times.

Winners (22): 1911, 1947, 1948, 1954, 1956, 1960, 1961, 1962, 1969, 1976, 1977, 1978, 1979, 1981, 1982, 1987, 1989, 1998, 1999, 2003, 2025, 2026
Runners-up (20): 1923, 1940, 1945, 1949, 1951, 1958, 1965, 1972, 1974, 1975, 1984, 1986, 1994, 2000, 2004, 2006, 2008, 2011, 2017, 2018

=== Rovers Cup ===
Mohun Bagan is the most successful team in Rovers Cup, with 14 titles. They are also the first Indian civilian club to be invited to participate in the Rovers Cup.

Winners (14): 1955, 1966, 1968, 1970, 1971, 1972, 1976, 1977, 1981, 1985, 1988, 1991, 1992, 2000
Runners-up (10): 1923, 1948, 1956, 1961, 1964, 1965, 1967, 1969, 1986, 1987

=== Other titles ===
- Sikkim Gold Cup

Winners (10) (record): 1984, 1985, 1986, 1989, 1991, 1992, 1994, 2000, 2001, 2017

- Bordoloi Trophy

Winners (7) (record): 1974, 1975, 1976, 1977, 1984, 1996, 2001

- All Airlines Gold Cup

Winners (8) (record): 1989, 1991, 1993, 2000, 2002, 2004, 2005, 2012

- Cooch Behar Cup

Winners (18) (record): 1904, 1905, 1907, 1912, 1916, 1921, 1922, 1925, 1928, 1931, 1935, 1936, 1941, 1944, 1948, 1949, 1962, 1972

- Trades Cup (record)

Winners (11): 1906, 1907, 1908, 1938, 1939, 1943, 1944, 1945, 1949, 1950, 1965

- Lakshmibilas Cup

Winners (7): 1909, 1910, 1928, 1937, 1939, 1940, 1941

- Gladstone Cup

Winners (4): 1905, 1906, 1908, 1911

- Sait Nagjee Football Tournament

Winners (2): 1978, 1981

- DCM Trophy

Winners (1): 1997

- Darjeeling Gold Cup

Winners (4): 1975, 1976, 1979, 1982

- Assam Independence Gold Cup

Winners (2): 1996, 1997

- ATPA Shield

Winners (1): 1993

- McDowell's Cup

Winners (1): 1996

- Scissors Cup

Winners (1): 1993

- PNB Centenary Invitational Trophy

Winners (1): 1995

- J.C. Guha Memorial Trophy

Winners (1): 1988

- Shibdas Bhaduri Memorial Tournament

Winners (1): 1993

- Amritabazar Centenary Trophy

Winners (1): 1968

- Chief Ministers Cup (CM trophy), Lucknow

Winners (1): 2024

- Bhadreswar Gold Cup

Winners (1): 2025

== Trophy count ==
Tournament	Winners
National Football League	3^{s}
I-League	2
Indian Super League Shield	2^{s}
ISL Cup	2
Federation Cup	14
Indian Super Cup	2
IFA Shield	22
Calcutta Football League	31
Durand Cup	17
Rovers Cup	14
Trades Cup	11
Total count	267^{m}

- Records
- ^{m} Including minor trophies
- ^{s} Shared records

== Goalscoring records ==
=== Top scorers in National League/I-League/ISL ===
Ranking	Nationality	Name	Years	Goals
1	Brazil	Jose Ramirez Barreto	1999-2004, 2006-2012	94
2	Nigeria	Odafa Onyeka Okolie	2011-2014	51
3	Australia	Dimi Petratos	2022-	29
4	India	Baichung Bhutia	2002-2003, 2006-2009	25
5	Haiti	Sony Nordé	2014–2019	24
6	India	Manvir Singh	2020–	21
6	Nigeria	Chidi Edeh	2009–2011	21
6	Cameroon	Aser Pierrick Dipanda	2017–2019	21
7	Fiji	Roy Krishna	2020–2022	19

- Only LEAGUE goals are Counted. ISL Playoff goals are NOT counted

=== Top scorers in Calcutta League ===
Ranking	Nationality	Name	Years	Goals
1	India	Chuni Goswami	1954-1968	145
2	India	Sisir Ghosh	1985-1992, 1995-1996	67
3	India	Manas Bhattacharya	1977-1980, 1982–1984,1986- 1988	64
4	India	Nanda Ray Chowdhury	1935-1943	63
5	India	Ashok Chatterjee	1961-1968, 1972	58
6	India	Subhash Bhowmick	1970-1972, 1976-1978	58
7	Brazil	Jose Ramirez Barreto	1999-2004, 2006-2012	57
8	India	Keshto Pal	1954-1959	57
9	India	Samar Banerjee	1952-1959	55
10	India	Shyam Thapa	1977-1983	55
11	India	Mohammad Akbar	1976-1978	51
12	India	Pungab Kannan	1966-1968, 1971, 1973-1975	51
13	Nigeria	Chima Okorie	1991-1992, 1997-1999	60

Source: Ei Samay (newspaper)

== AFC club record ==
All stats as per Mohun Bagan official site

Win Draw Loss

Season	Competition	Round	Club	1st leg	2nd leg	Agg.	Highest Scorer
1987	Asian Club Championship	Qualifying round	(Iraq) Al-Rasheed SC	0–5			Sisir Ghosh (6 goals)
1987	Asian Club Championship	Qualifying round	(Nepal) Manang Marshyangdi Club	4–1			Sisir Ghosh (6 goals)
1987	Asian Club Championship	Qualifying round	(Pakistan) PAF FC	4–1			Sisir Ghosh (6 goals)
1987	Asian Club Championship	Qualifying round	(Bangladesh) Mohammedan SC	2–2			Sisir Ghosh (6 goals)
1988–89	Asian Club Championship	Qualifying round	(Pakistan) Crescent Textile FC	3–0			Sisir Ghosh (5 goals)
1988–89	Asian Club Championship	Qualifying round	(Nepal) Kathmandu SC	4–2			Sisir Ghosh (5 goals)
1988–89	Asian Club Championship	Qualifying round	(Oman) Fanja SC	1–0			Sisir Ghosh (5 goals)
1988–89	Asian Club Championship	Semi-final round	(Kuwait) Kazma SC	1–0			Sisir Ghosh (5 goals)
1988–89	Asian Club Championship	Semi-final round	(China) Guangdong Hongyuan FC	3–0			Sisir Ghosh (5 goals)
1988–89	Asian Club Championship	Semi-final round	(Iraq) Al-Rasheed SC	2–0			Sisir Ghosh (5 goals)
1990–91	Asian Cup Winners' Cup	First round	(China) Dalian Shide FC	0–6	3–0	2–0	—
1994–95	Asian Club Championship	Preliminary round	(Maldives) Club Valencia	7–1			Tausif Jamal (4 goals)
1994–95	Asian Club Championship	Preliminary round	(Sri Lanka) Ratnam SC	3–1			Tausif Jamal (4 goals)
1994–95	Asian Club Championship	Second round	(Thailand) Thai Farmers Bank FC	0–9	2–0 (Note: The AFC ordered that the 2nd leg was to be played in Malaysia due to a plague threat in India, but Mohun Bagan objected to the ruling; Thai Farmers Bank was given a walkover and Mohun Bagan was ejected from the competition, fined $10,000 and banned from AFC competitions for three years. The ban was later lifted.)	9–0	Tausif Jamal (4 goals)
1995	Asian Club Championship	First round	(Maldives) Club Valencia	2–1	1–0	2–2 (a)	Manoharan, Satyabrata Bhowmik (1 goal each)
1999–00	Asian Club Championship	First round	(Bangladesh) Muktijoddha Sangsad KC	2–1	0–0	2–1	Chima Okorie, Dipendu Biswas (1 goal each)
1999–00	Asian Club Championship	Second round	(Japan) Júbilo Iwata	1–0	n/p (Note: The match was played over one leg by mutual agreement)	3–0	Chima Okorie, Dipendu Biswas (1 goal each)
2002–03	AFC Champions League	Qualifying stage	(Sri Lanka) Saunders SC	0–2	3–1	4–3	Baichung Bhutia (4 goals)
2002–03	AFC Champions League	Qualifying stage	(Maldives) Club Valencia	2–2	0–6	3–2	Baichung Bhutia (4 goals)
2002–03	AFC Champions League	Qualifying stage	(South Korea) Daejeon Hana Citizen	3–0	1–5	7–5	Baichung Bhutia (4 goals)
2007	AFC Cup	Group stage	(Singapore) Tampines Rovers FC	0–0	2–0	2–0	Lalawmpuia Pachuau (2 goals)
2007	AFC Cup	Group stage	(Thailand) Osotspa Samut Prakan FC	1–0	0–0	1–0	Lalawmpuia Pachuau (2 goals)
2007	AFC Cup	Group stage	(Malaysia) Pahang FC	1–7	2–0	3–2	Lalawmpuia Pachuau (2 goals)
2009	AFC Cup	Group stage	(Syria) Al-Karamah SC	1–0	0–4	5–0	Rakesh Masih (1 goal)
2009	AFC Cup	Group stage	(Jordan) Al-Wehdat SC	1–8	5–4	6–5	Rakesh Masih (1 goal)
2009	AFC Cup	Group stage	Kuwait SC	0–1	6–3	7–4	Rakesh Masih (1 goal)
2016	AFC Champions League	Qualifying stage	(Singapore) Tampines Rovers FC	3–2			Cornell Glen, Jeje Lalpekhlua, Katsumi Yusa (1 goal each)
2016	AFC Champions League	Qualifying stage	(China) Shandong Taishan FC	0–8			Cornell Glen, Jeje Lalpekhlua, Katsumi Yusa (1 goal each)
2016	AFC Cup	Group stage	(Maldives) Maziya S&RC	5–3	1–1	6–3	Jeje Lalpekhlua (6 goals)
2016	AFC Cup	Group stage	(Hong Kong) South China AA	0–10	0–6	4–3	Jeje Lalpekhlua (6 goals)
2016	AFC Cup	Group stage	(Myanmar) Yangon United FC	3–2	1–1	4–3	Jeje Lalpekhlua (6 goals)
2016	AFC Cup	Round of 16	(Singapore) Tampines Rovers FC	1–2			Jeje Lalpekhlua (6 goals)
2017	AFC Cup	Qualifying stage	(Sri Lanka) Colombo FC	1–4	2–1	4–3	Jeje Lalpekhlua (4 goals)
2017	AFC Cup	Qualifying stage	(Maldives) Club Valencia	1–1	4–3	5–4	Jeje Lalpekhlua (4 goals)
2017	AFC Cup	Group stage	(India) Bengaluru FC	2–1	3–2	4–3	Jeje Lalpekhlua (4 goals)
2017	AFC Cup	Group stage	(Bangladesh) Abahani Limited Dhaka	3–1	1–1	4–2	Jeje Lalpekhlua (4 goals)
2017	AFC Cup	Group stage	(Maldives) Maziya S&RC	0–1	5–3	5–3	Jeje Lalpekhlua (4 goals)
2021	AFC Cup	Group stage	(India) Bengaluru FC	2–0			Roy Krishna (2 goals)
2021	AFC Cup	Group stage	(Maldives) Maziya S&RC	3–1			Roy Krishna (2 goals)
2021	AFC Cup	Group stage	(Bangladesh) Bashundhara Kings	1–1			Roy Krishna (2 goals)
2021	AFC Cup	Inter-zone play-offs	(Uzbekistan) Nasaf Qarshi	0–6			Roy Krishna (2 goals)
2022	AFC Cup	Qualifying stage	(Sri Lanka) Blue Star SC	5–4			Liston Colaco (4 goals)
2022	AFC Cup	Qualifying stage	(Bangladesh) Abahani Limited Dhaka	3–1			Liston Colaco (4 goals)
2022	AFC Cup	Group stage	(India) Gokulam Kerala FC	2–5			Liston Colaco (4 goals)
2022	AFC Cup	Group stage	(Bangladesh) Bashundhara Kings	4–2			Liston Colaco (4 goals)
2022	AFC Cup	Group stage	(Maldives) Maziya S&RC	5–2			Liston Colaco (4 goals)
2022	AFC Cup	Inter-zone play-offs	(Malaysia) Kuala Lumpur City FC	1–6			Liston Colaco (4 goals)
2023–24	AFC Cup	Qualifying stage	(Nepal) Machhindra F.C.	3–1			Jason Cummings (4 goals)
2023–24	AFC Cup	Qualifying stage	(Bangladesh) Abahani Limited Dhaka	3–1			Jason Cummings (4 goals)
2023–24	AFC Cup	Group stage	(India) Odisha FC	4–0	2–5	6–5	Jason Cummings (4 goals)
2023–24	AFC Cup	Group stage	(Maldives) Maziya S&RC	2–1	0–1	2–2	Jason Cummings (4 goals)
2023–24	AFC Cup	Group stage	(Bangladesh) Bashundhara Kings	2–2	1–2	3–4	Jason Cummings (4 goals)
2024–25	AFC Champions League Two	Group stage	(Tajikistan) Ravshan Kulob	n/p (Note: On 7 October 2024, AFC announced that Mohun Bagan SG were considered to have withdrawn from the AFC Champions League Two after they failed to appear for their fixture against Tractor in Tabriz. Their single match against Ravshan Kulob 0–0 was voided.)	n/p	n/p	—
2024–25	AFC Champions League Two	Group stage	(Qatar) Al-Wakrah	n/p	n/p	n/p	—
2024–25	AFC Champions League Two	Group stage	(Iran) Tractor	n/p	n/p	n/p	—
2025–26	AFC Champions League Two	Group stage	(Iran) Sepahan	n/p	n/p	n/p	—
2025–26	AFC Champions League Two	Group stage	(Jordan) Al-Hussein	n/p	n/p	n/p	—
2025–26	AFC Champions League Two	Group stage	(Turkmenistan) Ahal	n/p	n/p	n/p	—

== Player records ==
- Club's all-time top goalscorer - (Brazil) Jose Ramirez Barreto (228 goals)
- Top goalscorer in National Football League/I-League - (Brazil) Jose Ramirez Barreto (94)
- Top goalscorer in Calcutta Football League - (India) Chuni Goswami (145)
