= 2025 AIFF Super Cup final =

Football cup tournament final for AIFF

2025 Super Cup final
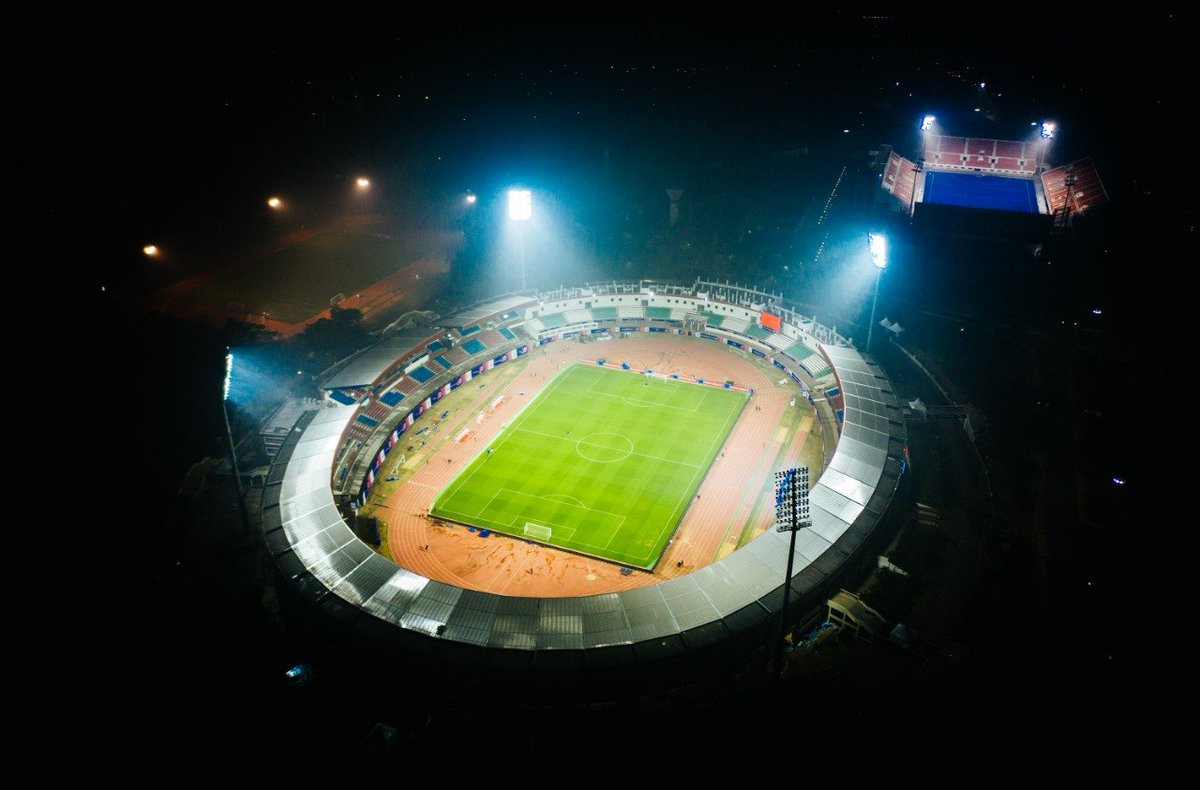
- Kalinga Stadium hosted the match
- Event: 2025 Kalinga Super Cup
Goa	Jamshedpur
3	0
- Date: 3 May 2025
- Venue: Kalinga Stadium, Bhubaneswar
- Player of the Match: Borja Herrera (Goa)
- Referee: Venkatesh Ramachadran
- Attendance: 7,156
- Weather: Warm and humid 32 °C (90 °F); 60% humidity

The 2025 Super Cup final was the final match of the 2025 Super Cup, the fifth edition of the Indian Super Cup. It was played at Kalinga Stadium in Bhubaneswar on 3 May 2025 between Goa and Jamshedpur.

FC Goa defeated the Jamshedpur FC 3–0 in the final to win their second national cup title. As the winners, Goa have qualified for the 2025–26 AFC Champions League Two preliminary stage.

== Road to the final ==
Goa		Round	Jamshedpur
Opponent	Result	Matches	Opponent	Result
Gokulam Kerala	3–0	Round of 16	Hyderabad	2–0
Punjab	2–1	Quarter-finals	Northeast United	0–0 (4–5 p)
Mohun Bagan	3–1	Semi-finals	Mumbai City	1–0

== Pre-match ==
=== Venue ===
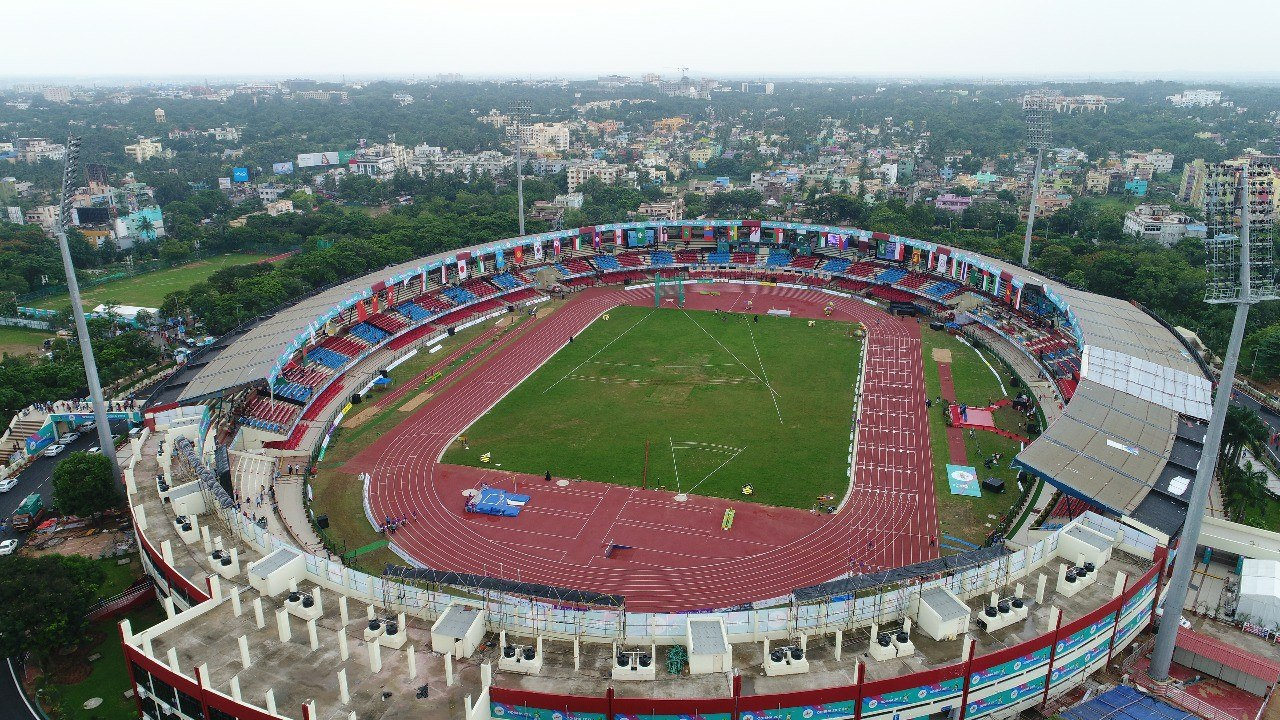
Kalinga Stadium in Bhubaneswar

On 18 December 2024, it was announced by the AIFF that the Kalinga Stadium in Bhubaneswar, Odisha would host the entire Super Cup.

This would be the fourth time that Kalinga Stadium would be hosting the Super Cup after 2018, 2019 and 2024.

== Match ==
=== Details ===
3 May 2025
19:30 IST (UTC+5:30)
Final

Goa	3–0	Jamshedpur
Herrera 23', 51'; Dražić 72'	Report; PDF; Khel Now

Kalinga Stadium, Bhubaneswar
Attendance: 7,156
Referee: Venkatesh Ramachadran
Man of the Match: Borja Herrera (Goa)

Goa	Jamshedpur

(India) Hrithik Tiwari (India) Sandesh Jhingan (India) Boris Singh (Spain) Odei Onaindia (C) (substituted off) 90+2' (India) Aakash Sangwan (substituted off) 66' (Spain) Carl McHugh (India) Udanta Singh (substituted off) 89' (India) Sahil Tavora (yellow card) 34' (substituted off) 90+2' (Spain) Borja Herrera (yellow card) 52' (substituted off) 66' (Spain) Iker Guarrotxena (Serbia) Dejan Dražić Substitutes: (India) Ayush Chhetri (substituted on) 66' (India) Jay Gupta (substituted on) 66' (India) Brison Fernandes (substituted on) 89' (India) Nim Dorjee (substituted on) 90+2' (India) Mohammad Yasir (substituted on) 90+2' (India) Lara Sharma (India) Rowllin Borges (India) Alan Saji (India) Seriton Fernandes (India) Muhammed Nemil Head Coach: (Spain) Manolo Márquez Manager: (India) Trevor Tomé Fernandes	(India) Albino Gomes (Serbia) Lazar Ćirković (India) Ashutosh Mehta (yellow card) 80' (Nigeria) Stephen Eze (yellow card) 14' (India) Muhammad Uvais (India) Pronay Halder (substituted off) 45' (Japan) Rei Tachikawa (Spain) Javi Hernández (C) (India) Nikhil Barla (substituted off) 45' (Australia) Jordan Murray (yellow card) 60' (substituted off) 81' (Spain) Javier Siverio Substitutes: (India) Mohammed Sanan (substituted on) 45' (India) Imran Khan (substituted on) 45' (substituted off) 89' (India) Ritwik Das (substituted on) 81' (India) Seiminlen Doungel (substituted on) 89' (India) Pratik Chowdhary (India) a Sreekuttan VS (India) Sourav Das (India) Amrit Gope (India) Kartik Chowdhary (India) Chawngthu Lalhriatpuia Head Coach: (India) Khalid Jamil Manager: (India) Rohit Kumar Singh

Hero of the Match:
Borja Herrera (Goa) Assistant referees:
Parasuraman Vairamuthu
Ujjal Halder
Fourth official:
Pratik Mondal
Match commissioner:
Ravishankar Jayaraman
Referee Assessor:
Basker Purushothaman
Media Officer:
Soumo Ghosh
General Coordinator:
Himanshu Kharolia

Match rules

- 90 minutes.
- 30 minutes of extra time if necessary.
- Penalty shoot-out if scores still level.
- Ten named substitutes
- Maximum of five substitutions, with a sixth allowed in extra time.
