= 1996–97 National Football League (India) =

1st season of National Football League

National Football League
- Season: 1996–97
- Dates: 17 December 1996 – 16 March 1997
- Champions: JCT Mills; 1st NFL title 1st Indian title
- Relegated: none
- Asian Club Championship: Churchill Brothers
- Top goalscorer: Bhaichung Bhutia (14 goals)
- Biggest home win: JCT Mills 6–1 Mahindra (9 February 1997)
- Biggest away win: Mahindra 1–4 Indian Bank (13 February 1997)
- Highest scoring: JCT Mills 6–1 Mahindra (9 February 1997)

The 1996–97 National Football League, also known as the Philips National League for sponsorship reasons, was the inaugural season of the National Football League. The tournament began on 17 December 1996 and concluded on 16 March 1997. Before the commencement, the All India Football Federation maintained that it would be a semi-professional tournament for the first two years.

Philips India was the main sponsor for the tournament and a total prize money of ₹1.5 crore was announced; ₹35 lakh to the winner. Twelve teams took part in the competition, which was played in two round robin stages: a preliminary group stage featuring two groups of six teams each played in Calcutta and Goa, and a main stage featuring the top four from each group played after a gap of three weeks following the first. East Bengal were the favorites to win the competition by virtue of their victories in the Federation Cup and the Calcutta League earlier that season. However, in a closely fought second stage mostly between JCT Mills and Churchill Brothers, the former sealed the title on the final day with a win over Dempo, courtesy a hat trick by Bhaichung Bhutia. Air India's Godfrey Pereira was named the best player of the league and JCT Mills' Sukhwinder Singh, the best manager. JCT Mills also won the Fairplay Trophy, which carried a purse of ₹2.5 lakh.

The bottom two clubs in each group would not take part in the next edition, although Mohun Bagan would play the following season.

== Overview ==
The first match of the inaugural season of the National Football League kicked off at around 5:45 p.m. (IST), an hour after the scheduled time, on 17 December 1996 between East Bengal and Mohammedan Sporting at the Salt Lake Stadium in Calcutta. It was inaugurated by then India's Prime Minister H. D. Deve Gowda. East Bengal defeated Mohammedan Sporting 2–1 with Raman Vijayan scoring a brace for his team; the first goal coming in the 10th minute.

== Teams ==
=== Stadia and locations ===
Locations of teams in the 1996–97 National Football League
Group A
Group B

== Group stage ==
- Top four advance to the Championship stage.

=== Group A ===
Pos	Team	Pld	W	D	L	GF	GA	GD	Pts	Qualification
1	JCT Mills	5	3	2	0	9	3	+6	11	Qualify for Championship stage
2	East Bengal	5	3	2	0	6	2	+4	11	Qualify for Championship stage
3	Salgaocar	5	2	3	0	2	0	+2	9	Qualify for Championship stage
4	Indian Bank	5	2	0	3	3	5	−2	6	Qualify for Championship stage
5	Mohammedan Sporting	5	1	0	4	3	6	−3	3	Eliminated
6	Indian Telephone Industries	5	0	1	4	3	10	−7	1	Eliminated

Source: rsssf.com

=== Group B ===
Pos	Team	Pld	W	D	L	GF	GA	GD	Pts	Qualification
1	Dempo	5	4	0	1	7	1	+6	12	Qualify for Championship stage
2	Air India	5	3	1	1	7	6	+1	10	Qualify for Championship stage
3	Churchill Brothers	5	2	1	2	7	6	+1	7	Qualify for Championship stage
4	Mahindra & Mahindra	5	2	1	2	6	7	−1	7	Qualify for Championship stage
5	Mohun Bagan	5	1	3	1	6	5	+1	6	Eliminated
6	Kerala Police	5	0	0	5	3	11	−8	0	Eliminated

Source: rsssf.com

== Championship stage ==
Pos	Team	Pld	W	D	L	GF	GA	GD	Pts	Qualification
1	JCT Mills	14	9	3	2	26	8	+18	30	Champions
2	Churchill Brothers	14	8	5	1	20	10	+10	29	Asian Club Championship
3	East Bengal	14	7	4	3	19	11	+8	25	
4	Dempo	14	4	6	4	19	17	+2	18	
5	Indian Bank	14	3	6	5	14	18	−4	15	
6	Air India	14	3	6	5	11	16	−5	15	
7	Salgaocar	14	3	4	7	8	13	−5	13	
8	Mahindra & Mahindra	14	1	0	13	10	34	−24	3	

Source: rsssf.com

Philips National League
champions
JCT Mills
1st title

== Season statistics ==
=== Hat-tricks ===
Player	For	Against	Result	Date	Ref.
Bhaichung Bhutia^{5}	JCT Mills	Mahindra	6–1 (H)	9 February 1997	
Bhaichung Bhutia	JCT Mills	Dempo	4–1 (A)	16 March 1997	

^{5} Player scored five goals

Note: (H) – Home; (A) – Away

== 1996-97 Season Roll of Honour ==
Competition	Winner	Details
National Football League	JCT FC	1st Championship
Federation Cup	East Bengal	Defeated Dempo SC 2:1
Super Cup	East Bengal	Defeated JCT FC 0:0 (4:2 Pens)
Santosh Trophy	Bengal	Defeated Goa 1:0
Governor's Gold Cup	Air India	Defeated Mohun Bagan 0:0 (4:3 Pens)
96th Rover's Cup	Salgaocar SC	Defeated Air India 1:0
102nd IFA Shield	JCT FC	Defeated Karkh Club (Iraq) 1:0
Bordoloi Trophy	Mohun Bagan	Defeated East Bengal 2:1
5th Scissors Cup	Dempo SC	Defeated Indian Bank 1:0
McDowell's Cup	Mohun Bagan	Defeated East Bengal 2:0
Airlines Gold Cup	All Nepal FA XI	Defeated East Bengal 2:1
