= 2024 AIFF Super Cup final =

Football cup tournament final for AIFF

2024 Super Cup final
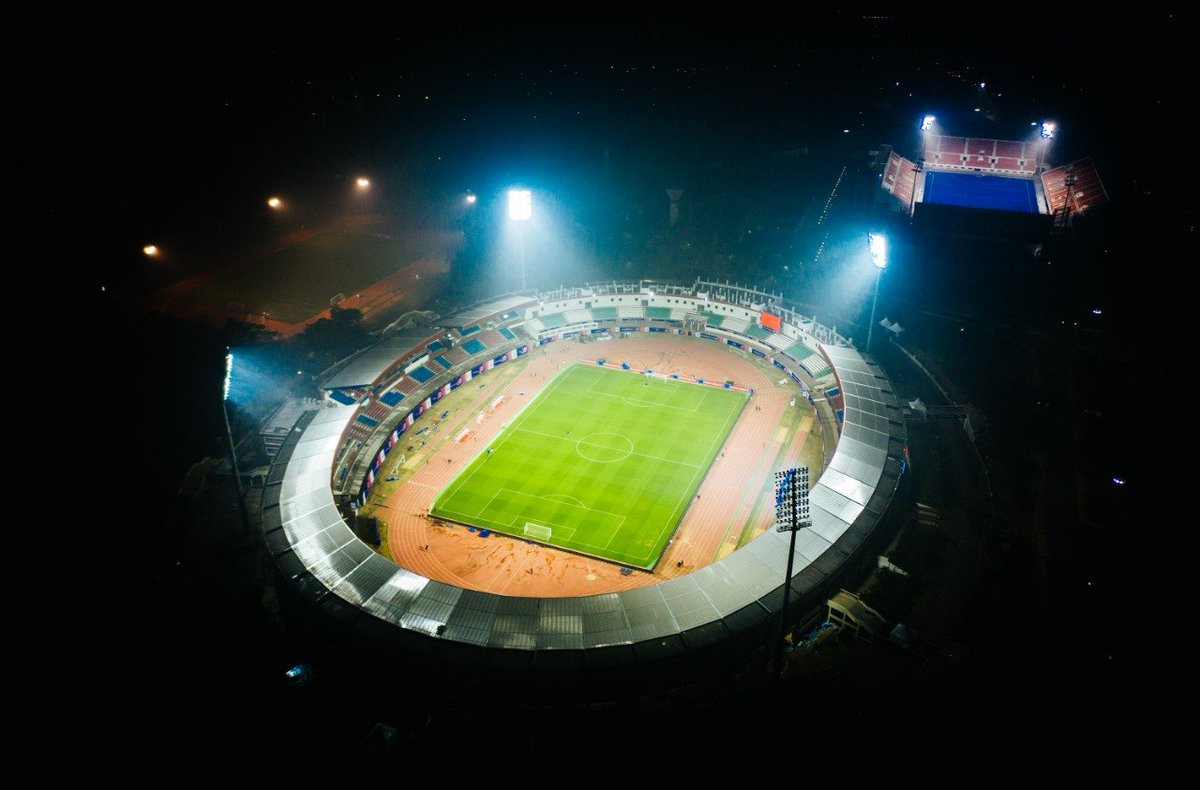
- Kalinga Stadium hosted the match
- Event: 2024 Super Cup
East Bengal	Odisha
3	2
- After Extra Time
- Date: 28 January 2024
- Venue: Kalinga Stadium, Bhubaneswar
- Player of the Match: Saúl Crespo (East Bengal)
- Referee: Venkatesh R.
- Attendance: 10,121
- Weather: Warm and humid

The 2024 Super Cup final was the final match of the 2024 Super Cup, the fourth edition of the Super Cup. It was played at Kalinga Stadium in Bhubaneswar on 28 January 2024 between East Bengal and Odisha.

East Bengal won the match 3–2 for their ninth national cup title and the first major title in 12 years.

== Road to the final ==
The Super Cup is a new annual Indian knock-out football competition that is open to all twelve teams in the Indian Super League and top four teams from the I-League and is run by the All India Football Federation.

The Indian Super League teams automatically qualified for the competition. The top three teams of the I-League qualified automatically while the fourth spot was decided via a play-off match between Inter Kashi and Rajasthan United.

=== East Bengal ===
Before the 2024 Indian Super Cup, East Bengal had reached the final of the Federation Cup and Super Cup, India's top domestic cup competitions, 17 times and won the tournament eight times. East Bengal last reached the final in 2018 but came runner-up to Bengaluru. East Bengal was grouped in Group A, alongside Indian Super League sides – Mohun Bagan, Hyderabad and an I-League side Sreenidhi Deccan. East Bengal began their Super Cup campaign on 9 January 2024 and faced Hyderabad in the opening fixture of the tournament and managed a 3–2 victory with Cleiton Silva scoring a brace and Saúl Crespo scoring the third. On 14 January, East Bengal faced Sreenidhi Deccan and won 2–1 with goals from Hijazi Maher and Javier Siverio. On 19 January, East Bengal faced their arch-rivals Mohun Bagan in the Kolkata Derby fixture in a virtual quarter-final tie that would decide the group champions and who would progress into the semi-finals and East Bengal won 3–1 with captain Cleiton Silva scoring a brace while Nandhakumar Sekar scoring the other, as East Bengal won all three matches in the group to qualify for the semi-final. On 24 January, East Bengal faced Group B winners Jamshedpur in the semi-finals and won 2–0 with goals from Hijazi Maher and Javier Siverio as they entered the final for the second time, after 2018.

=== Odisha ===
Odisha started the campaign as the defending champions of the Super Cup having won it the previous year in 2023. They were grouped in Group D, alongside Indian Super League sides – Goa, Bengaluru and I-League side Inter Kashi. Odisha started their campaign on 12 January 2024 against Indian Super League side Bengaluru and won 1–1 courtesy of a solitary strike from Ahmed Jahouh. On 17 January, Odisha faced Inter Kashi and won 3–0 with goals from Lalthathanga Khawlhring, Diego Mauricio, and Isak Vanlalruatfela. On 22 January, Odisha faced Goa in the last match of the group stage and won 3–2 with goals from Ahmed Jahou and Mourtada Fall scoring a brace. In the semi-final, Odisha faced Mumbai City on 25 January and won 1–1 courtesy of a penalty goal by Diego Mauricio as Odisha entered their second consecutive final in the Super Cup.

== Pre-match ==
=== Venue ===
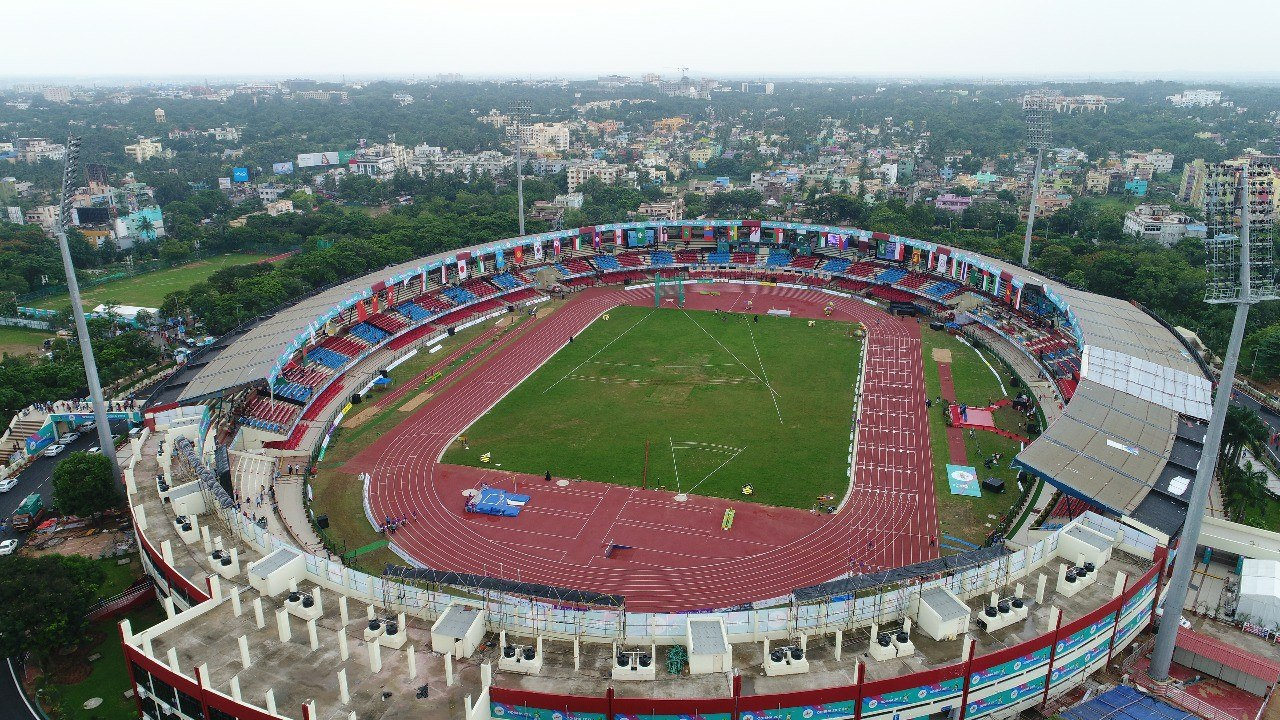
Kalinga Stadium in Bhubaneswar

On 18 December 2023, it was announced by the AIFF that the Kalinga Stadium in Bhubaneswar, Odisha would host the entire Super Cup.

This would be the third time that Kalinga Stadium would be hosting the Super Cup after 2018 and 2019.

=== Analysis ===
Coming into this match, both sides looked at it as a chance to qualify for the 2024–25 AFC Champions League Two preliminary stage. Odisha were the defending champions of the tournament, this time playing at their home ground Kalinga Stadium, hoping to defend the title. Their coach Sergio Lobera had already won the trophy in 2019 with Goa. He stated before the match, "We have a big game in front of us. We have the responsibility to keep the trophy here. We are excited about this opportunity and the most important thing is to enjoy this final. It's a big game for everyone - the players, coaches, staff and supporters,".

East Bengal were looking to break their twelve-year wait for a major domestic trophy having last won the 2012 Federation Cup at Siliguri defeating Dempo in the final. East Bengal had already reached the 2023 Durand Cup final in the season and finished runner-up. Coach Carles Cuadrat said before the match, "We are feeling very good. We have been fighting for results for a long time. It's very important for us to be in another final. We couldn't win the first one (Durand Cup), so we'll try our best to get the result in this one,".

== Match ==
=== Summary ===
The defending champions Odisha started at a frantic pace at their home ground Kalinga Stadium with Diego Mauricio coming close twice to take the lead and Odisha eventually scored the first goal of the match in the thirty-ninth minute when Diego Mauricio pounced on a loose ball inside the box to finish it and make it 1–0 before half time. East Bengal made two changes as they came out in the second half with Naorem Mahesh Singh and Lalchungnunga coming on for Javier Siverio and Mandar Rao Dessai respectively and they made an instant impact as Mahesh got passed two Odisha players to play a perfect through ball for Nandhakumar Sekar as the later dribbled past the Odisha goalkeeper to equalize the game in the fifty-first minute. Just ten minutes later, East Bengal was awarded a penalty when Mourtada Fall tripped Borja Herrera inside the box and Saúl Crespo made it 2–1 from the spot. Just seven minutes later, Odisha found themselves a man down as Mourtada Fall received a second yellow for an elbow on Borja Herrera. East Bengal had a few more chances to finish the game but Odisha earned themselves a penalty at the very last second of the match in the injury time and Ahmed Jahouh equalized for Odisha to take the game into extra time. In the first half of the extra time, Souvik Chakrabarti came close to getting the lead back for East Bengal as his close effort struck the bar but minutes later Souvik received his second yellow for time wasting and both teams went down to ten men. In the hundred-eleventh minute, East Bengal scored the winner as captain Cleiton Silva pounced on Narender Gahlot to snatch the ball inside the box and finish it to make it 3–2 as East Bengal managed to hold onto the lead and become the champions of the 2024 Indian Super Cup.

=== Details ===
28 January 2023
19:30 IST

East Bengal	3–2 (a.e.t.)	Odisha
Sekar 51'; Crespo 62' (pen.); Chakrabarti (yellow card) 87' (yellow-red card) 97'; Silva 111'	Report; Report	Mauricio 39'; Fall (yellow card) 61' (yellow-red card) 68'; Jahouh 90+9' (pen.)

Kalinga Stadium, Bhubaneswar
Attendance: 10,121
Referee: Venkatesh R

East Bengal	Odisha

GK	13	(India) Prabhsukhan Singh Gill
RB	12	(India) Mohammad Rakip
CB	4	(Spain) José Antonio Pardo
CB	19	(Jordan) Hijazi Maher
LB	17	(India) Mandar Rao Dessai	(substituted off) 45'
CM	23	(India) Souvik Chakrabarti	(yellow card) 87' (yellow-red card) 97'
CM	21	(Spain) Saúl Crespo
CM	26	(Spain) Borja Herrera	(substituted off) 99'
FW	10	(Brazil) Cleiton Silva
FW	11	(India) Nandhakumar Sekar	(substituted off) 74'
FW	99	(Spain) Javier Siverio	(substituted off) 45'
Substitutes:
GK	1	(India) Kamaljit Singh
DF	5	(India) Lalchungnunga	(substituted on) 45'
MF	6	(India) Ajay Chhetri	(substituted on) 99'
MF	8	(India) Edwin Sydney Vanspaul
FW	20	(India) V. P. Suhair
DF	22	(India) Nishu Kumar
MF	29	(India) Naorem Mahesh Singh	(substituted on) 45'
DF	33	(India) Gursimrat Singh Gill
FW	82	(India) P. V. Vishnu	(substituted on) 74'	(substituted off) 85'
FW	84	(India) Sayan Banerjee	(substituted on) 85'
Manager:
(Spain) Carles Cuadrat

GK	28	(India) Lalthuammawia Ralte
RB	4	(India) Amey Ranawade
CB	15	(Senegal) Mourtada Fall	(yellow card) 61' (yellow-red card) 68'
CB	5	(Spain) Carlos Delgado
LB	18	(India) Jerry Lalrinzuala	(substituted off) 73'
CM	10	(Morocco) Ahmed Jahouh
LM	19	(India) Isak Vanlalruatfela
RM	7	(India) Lalthathanga Khawlhring	(substituted off) 73'
FW	21	(Fiji) Roy Krishna
FW	9	(Brazil) Diego Mauricio
FW	11	(Japan) Cy Goddard	(substituted off) 90'
Substitutes:
GK	13	(India) Niraj Kumar
DF	3	(India) Narender Gahlot	(substituted on) 90'
MF	14	(India) Pranjal Bhumij
MF	17	(India) Jerry Mawihmingthanga
DF	24	(India) Thoiba Singh Moirangthem
MF	25	(India) Princeton Rebello
DF	26	(India) Laldinliana R
DF	32	(India) Vignesh Dakshinamurthy	(substituted on) 73'
MF	42	(India) Lenny Rodrigues	(substituted on) 73'
FW	99	(India) Aniket Jadhav
Manager:
(Spain) Sergio Lobera

Hero of the Match:
Saúl Crespo (East Bengal)

Assistant referees:
Arun Sasidharan Pillai
P Vairamuthu
Fourth official:
Crystal John
Match commissioner:
Binod Kumar Singh

Match rules

- 90 minutes.
- 30 minutes of extra time if necessary.
- Penalty shoot-out if scores still level.
- Ten named substitutes
- Maximum of five substitutions, with a sixth allowed in extra time.

== Post match ==
East Bengal captain Cleiton Silva ended the tournament as the highest goalscorer of the campaign while defender Hijazi Maher was awarded the 'Best Defender of the Tournament' award. Odisha goalkeeper Lalthuammawia Ralte was awarded the 'Best Goalkeeper of the Tournament', Ahmed Jahouh as the 'Best Midfielder of the Tournament', while Isak Vanlalruatfela was awarded as the 'Player of the Tournament'.

The team was welcomed by the East Bengal fans at the Netaji Subhas Chandra Bose International Airport, Kolkata by an estimated 5,000+ crowd with pyros, smokes, and red and gold colors. The team was escorted from the airport to the club premises where thousands more joined in to celebrate the triumph.

East Bengal also earned a spot in the 2024–25 AFC Champions League Two Preliminary stage and thus returned to the continental stage after a gap of nine years since their last participation in the 2015 AFC Cup.
