= Babu Mani =

Indian footballer (died 2022)

Personal information
- Date of birth: c. 1963
- Place of birth: Bangalore, Mysore State, India
- Date of death: 19 November 2022 (aged 59)
- Place of death: Kolkata, India
- Position: Forward

Senior career*
| Years | Team | Apps | (Gls) |
| 1984 | Mohammedan Sporting | | |
| 1984–1990 | Mohun Bagan | | |
| 1990–1992 | East Bengal | | |
| 1992– | Mohun Bagan | | |

International career
| 1984– | India | 55 | |
- * Club domestic league appearances and goals

Babu Mani (c. 1963 – 19 November 2022) was an Indian footballer who played for India as a forward in the 1984 AFC Asian Cup. He also played for Mohun Bagan. He also played for East Bengal under the coaching of Syed Nayeemuddin.

Mani made his international debut against Argentina in the 1984 Nehru Cup. He was part of the squad which qualified and participated in the 1984 AFC Asian Cup.

== Honours ==
India

- South Asian Games Gold medal: 1985, 1987

Bengal

- Santosh Trophy: 1986–87, 1988–89

Mohammedan Sporting

- Federation Cup: 1983–84

Mohun Bagan

- Calcutta Football League: 1984, 1986, 1992
- IFA Shield: 1987
- Durand Cup: 1984, 1985, 1986
- Rovers Cup: 1985, 1992
- Federation Cup: 1986–87, 1987–88, 1992, 1993

East Bengal

- Calcutta Football League: 1991
- IFA Shield: 1990, 1991
- Durand Cup: 1990, 1991
- Rovers Cup: 1990
