= 2023 AIFF Super Cup final =

2023 Super Cup final
- Event: 2023 Indian Super Cup
Bengaluru	Odisha
1	2
- Date: 25 April 2023
- Venue: EMS Stadium, Kozhikode
- Hero of the match: Diego Maurício (Odisha)
- Referee: Rahul Kumar Gupta
- Attendance: 6,952
- Weather: Warm and humid

The 2023 Super Cup final was the final match of the 2023 Super Cup, the third edition of the Super Cup. It was played at EMS Stadium in Kozhikode on 25 April 2023 between Bengaluru and Odisha.

Odisha won the match 2–1 for their first ever major title. The winners also qualified for the qualifier for 2023–24 AFC Cup group stage.

== Match ==
25 April 2023
19:00 IST

Bengaluru	1–2	Odisha
Chhetri 85' (pen.)	Report	Maurício 23', 38'

EMS Stadium, Kozhikode
Attendance: 6,952
Referee: Rahul Kumara Gupta

Bengaluru	Odisha

GK	1	(India) Gurpreet Singh Sandhu
DF	32	(India) Roshan Singh
DF	3	(India) Sandesh Jhingan
DF	18	(India) Rohit Kumar		(substituted off) 46'
MF	7	(India) Jayesh Rane		(substituted off) 46'
MF	8	(Australia) Suresh Wangjam	(yellow card) 22'
DF	6	(Brazil) Bruno Ramires
DF	25	(India) Namgyal Bhutia
FW	11	(India) Sunil Chhetri	(yellow card) 60'
FW	22	(Fiji) Roy Krishna
FW	21	(India) Udanta Singh
Substitutes:
GK	30	(India) Lara Sharma
DF	2	(Australia) Aleksandar Jovanovic		(substituted in) 46'
DF	27	(India) Parag Shrivas
DF	33	(India) Prabir Das
DF	44	(India) Robin Yadav
MF	45	(India) Lalremtluanga Fanai
FW	23	(Spain) Pablo Pérez		(substituted in) 46'
FW	31	(India) Leon Augustine
FW	39	(India) Sivasakthi Narayanan
Head coach:
(England) Simon Grayson

GK	1	(India) Amrinder Singh
DF	36	(India) Sahil Panwar
DF	5	(Spain) Carlos Delgado
DF	6	(Australia) Osama Malik
DF	3	(India) Narender Gahlot	(yellow card) 90+3'
MF	25	(India) Princeton Rebello		(substituted off) 86'
MF	24	(India) Thoiba Singh
FW	11	(India) Nandhakumar Sekar		(substituted off) 78'
MF	32	(Spain) Víctor Rodríguez		(substituted off) 90+1'
FW	17	(India) Jerry Mawihmingthanga		(substituted off) 86'
FW	9	(Brazil) Diego Maurício		(substituted off) 86'
Substitutes:
GK	28	(India) Lalthuammawia Ralte
DF	30	(India) Denechandra Meitei
DF	39	(India) Lalruatthara
MF	10	(India) Raynier Fernandes
MF	21	(Spain) Saúl Crespo		(substituted in) 86'
MF	29	(India) Paul Ramfangzauva		(substituted in) 86'
MF	48	(India) Isaac Vanmalsawma		(substituted in) 86'
FW	7	(Spain) Pedro Martín		(substituted in) 90+1'
FW	19	(India) Isak Vanlalruatfela
FW	99	(India) Aniket Jadhav		(substituted in) 78'
Head coach:
(India) Clifford Miranda

Hero of the Match:
Diego Maurício (Odisha)

Match rules

- 90 minutes.
- 30 minutes of extra time if necessary.
- Penalty shoot-out if scores still level.
- Maximum of five substitutions.
