= 2001 Indian Federation Cup =

24th edition of the Federation Cup

2001 Federation Cup
Tournament details
- Country: India
- Dates: 18–30 August 2001
- Teams: 16

Final positions
- Champions: Mohun Bagan (11th title)
- Runners-up: Dempo

Tournament statistics
- Matches played: 15
- Goals scored: 25 (1.67 per match)
- Top goal scorer(s): Jose Ramirez Barreto (4 goals)

Awards
- Best player: Jose Ramirez Barreto (Mohun Bagan)

The 2001 Indian Federation Cup was the 24th season of the Indian Federation Cup. It was held between 18 and 30 August 2001. Mohun Bagan, the defending champions having won the 1998 tournament, the last time it was held, beat Dempo 2–1 in the final.

== Match officials ==
The All India Football Federation named 18 referees for the tournament. Manian of Asian Football Confederation was chosen as referee instructor, S. R. Dev as match commissioner and M. G. Suvarna as referee-in-charge.

State	Referee
Delhi	Rizwan-ul Haq
Delhi	Krishna Avatar
Karnataka	S. M. Balu
Karnataka	Bharath Mani
Kerala	Shaji Kurien
Madhya Pradesh	P. K. Bose
Bihar	V. K. Singh
Assam	M. K. Roy
Gujarat	Dinesh Nair
Goa	Gokuldas Nagvenkar
Maharashtra	Walter Pereira
Maharashtra	Manuel Pereira
West Bengal	Jayanta Chkraborthy
West Bengal	Udayan Haldar
Tamil Nadu	S. Suresh
Tamil Nadu	K. Sankar
Tamil Nadu	P. Bhasker
Tamil Nadu	T. Pradeep Kumar

== Results ==
In case of a tie at regular time, extra time with golden goal was used. In case scores remain tied even after extra time, penalty shoot-out was used.

=== Pre-quarterfinals (round of 16) ===
18 August
16:15 IST

JCT Mills	1–0 (a.e.t.)	Vasco
Harvinder Singh Jr. 95'	Report

Jawaharlal Nehru Stadium, Chennai

18 August
18:30 IST

FC Kochin	0–1	Dempo
	Report	Sukhdev Arwade 79'

Jawaharlal Nehru Stadium, Chennai

19 August
16:15 IST

East Bengal	0–1	Sporting Clube de Goa
	Report	Alex Colaco 52'

Jawaharlal Nehru Stadium, Chennai

19 August
18:30 IST

Tollygunge Agragami	1–0	HAL
Sandip Das 62'	Report

Jawaharlal Nehru Stadium, Chennai

20 August
16:15 IST

Mahindra United	1–0	Indian Telephone Industries
IS Singh 13'	Report

Jawaharlal Nehru Stadium, Chennai

20 August
18:30 IST

Salgaocar	0–0 (a.e.t.)	Punjab Police
	Report
Penalties
J. Murali (penalty scored); V.K. Harish (penalty scored); Lawrence (penalty scored); Dharamjit Singh (penalty scored); Remy Colaco (penalty scored)	5–4	Balwinder Singh (penalty scored); Sher Singh (penalty scored); Gurpreet Singh (penalty scored); Gurinderpal Singh (penalty scored); Naresh Kumar (penalty missed)

Jawaharlal Nehru Stadium, Chennai

21 August
16:15 IST

Churchill Brothers	1–0	State Bank of Travancore
Francis Coelho 55'	Report

Jawaharlal Nehru Stadium, Chennai

21 August
18:30 IST

Mohun Bagan	2–1	Air India
R. Singh 7'; Barreto 60'	Report	Moosa 66' (pen.)

Jawaharlal Nehru Stadium, Chennai
Referee: S. M. Balu (Karnataka)

=== Quarter-finals ===
22 August
18:00 IST

Sporting Clube de Goa	2–1 (a.e.t.)	Tollygunge Agragami
Chukwuma 73' (pen.); Kamal Suleiman 112'	Report	Sasthi Duley 67'

Jawaharlal Nehru Stadium, Chennai

23 August
18:00 IST

JCT	1–0	Dempo
Alesha Shameki 30'	Report

Jawaharlal Nehru Stadium, Chennai
Attendance: Pradip Kumar (Tamil Nadu)

24 August
IST

Churchill Brothers	0–1	Mahindra United
	Report	Jamil 61' (pen.)

Jawaharlal Nehru Stadium, Chennai
Referee: Binod Kumar Singh

24 August
IST

Mohun Bagan	3–1	Salgaocar
Barreto 30'; Abdul Latif Seriki 36', 85'	Report	Lawrence 25'

Jawaharlal Nehru Stadium, Chennai

=== Semi-finals ===
26 August
18:00 IST

Sporting Clube de Goa	1–2	Dempo
Francis Andrade 23'	Report	Naik 76'; Levy Coelho 88'

Jawaharlal Nehru Stadium, Chennai

27 August
18:00 IST

Mahindra United	0–2	Mohun Bagan
	Report	Barreto 40'; JL Singh 66'

Jawaharlal Nehru Stadium, Chennai
Referee: S. M. Balu (Karnataka)

=== Final ===
30 August
18:00 IST

Mohun Bagan	2–0	Dempo
Barreto 13'; Abdul Latif Seriki 78'	Report

Jawaharlal Nehru Stadium, Chennai
Referee: S. Suresh (Tamil Nadu)
