= 2019 AIFF Super Cup final =

2019 Super Cup final
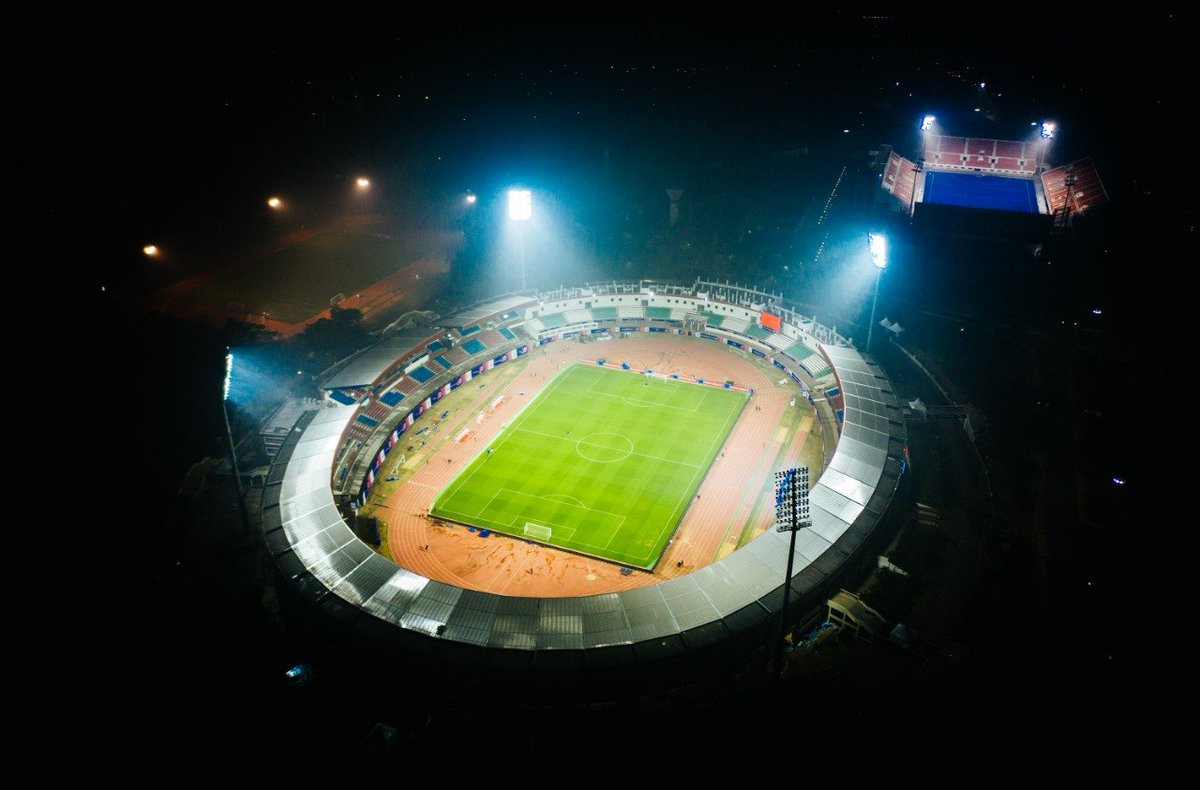
- Kalinga Stadium hosted the match
- Event: 2019 Indian Super Cup
Goa	Chennaiyin
2	1
- Date: 13 April 2019
- Venue: Kalinga Stadium, Bhubaneshwar
- Hero of the match: Mohammad Nawaz (Goa)
- Referee: Ajit Meetei
- Attendance: 1,500
- Weather: Warm and humid

The 2019 Super Cup final was the final match of the 2019 Indian Super Cup, the second edition of the Super Cup. It was played at Kalinga Stadium in Bhubaneshwar on 13 April 2019 between Goa and Chennaiyin.

Goa won the match 2–1 for their first ever major title.

== Match ==
13 April 2019
20:30 IST

Goa	2–1	Chennaiyin
Coro 51'; B. Fernandes 64'	Report	Augusto 54'

Kalinga Stadium, Bhubaneshwar
Attendance: 1,500
Referee: Ajit Meetei

Goa	Chennaiyin

Man of the Match:
Mohammad Nawaz

Assistant referees:
J Tony
Antony Abraham
Fourth official:
Rahul Kumar Gupta

Match rules

- 90 minutes.
- 30 minutes of extra time if necessary.
- Penalty shoot-out if scores still level.
