= Henry Menezes =

Indian former footballer and football manager

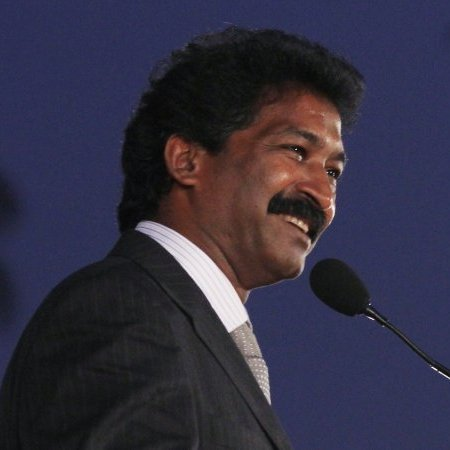
- Menezes in 2011

Personal information
- Date of birth: 30 April 1964 (age 62)
- Place of birth: Mumbai, India
- Height: 1.83 m (6 ft 0 in)
- Position: Goalkeeper

Youth career
- 1979–1982: Maharashtra

College career
| Years | Team | Apps | (Gls) |
| 1983–1990 | Maharashtra | | |

Senior career*
| Years | Team | Apps | (Gls) |
| 1979–1982 | Maharashtra | | |
| 1982–1983 | Mafatlal SC | 21 | (0) |
| 1983–1987 | Bank of India | 182 | (0) |
| 1987–1995 | Mahindra United | 288 | (0) |
| 1984–1992 | Maharashtra | | |
| Total | | 491 | (0) |

International career
| 1985–1992 | India | 17 | (0) |

Managerial career
- 2002–2007: Mahindra United
- 2007–2010: India (technical assistant)
- 2008–2009: Mumbai FC (director)
- 2009–2010: Mahindra United (general manager)
- 2013–: India (technical assistant)
- * Club domestic league appearances and goals

Henry Menezes (born 30 April 1964) is an Indian professional football manager and former player who played as a goalkeeper. He represented the India national team from 1985 to 1992, earning 17 caps, and captained Mahindra United during one of the club's most successful periods.

Born in Mumbai, Menezes began playing football at the age of 15, representing the Maharashtra under-19 team before making his professional debut with Mafatlal Sports Club in 1982. He later played for Bank of India and Mahindra United, making over 490 career appearances. At Mahindra United, he served as captain and became one of India's leading goalkeepers.

After retiring, Menezes transitioned into management and administration. He was General Manager of Mahindra United and played a key role in founding Mumbai FC. He also served as a technical assistant for the India national team, director at Mumbai FC, and CEO of the Western India Football Association (WIFA), the governing body for football in Maharashtra, affiliated with the AIFF. He is also a Governing Council member of the International Sports University, Maharashtra, and deputy chairman of the AIFF technical committee.

Menezes has received several accolades, including the Shiv Chhatrapati Award, Maharashtra’s highest state award for excellence in sports, in 1986. He was part of the Indian football team that won gold at the 1987 South Asian Games and bronze at the 1989 South Asian Games. He is widely recognized for his contributions to Indian football both on and off the field.

== Playing career ==
Menezes began playing football at the age of 15, representing the Maharashtra state under-19 team in 1979–80 and 1980–81. Within two years, he was ready to turn professional.

He played as a goalkeeper, beginning his professional career with Mafatlal Sports Club in Mumbai at the age of 17 in 1982. After one season, he moved to the Bank of India football team, where he played for five years.

In 1988, he joined Mahindra United and remained there until 1995, during which time he was the club's most successful captain. He also represented the India national football team. His professional playing career ended at Mahindra United, after which he began a management career.

== Managerial career ==
Menezes was the General Manager of Mahindra United Football Club, Mumbai, which was disbanded in 2010. He was instrumental in creating Mumbai FC and served as its General Manager in the I-League before rejoining Mahindra United at the end of the 2006–2007 season.

=== AIFF ===
Menezes has held various roles in football administration. He is a Governing Council member of the International Sports University, Maharashtra, and deputy chairman of the All India Football Federation technical committee. He also worked as the Chief Executive Officer (CEO) at the Western India Football Association (WIFA), the governing body for football in Maharashtra.

== Honours and achievements ==
- Menezes received Maharashtra's highest award, the Shiv Chhatrapati Award, for excellence in sports in 1986.
- Member of the Indian Football Team at the 1987 South Asian Games in Kolkata, India – GOLD MEDAL.
- Member of the Indian Football Team at the 1989 South Asian Games in Islamabad, Pakistan – BRONZE MEDAL.
