= Scissors Cup =

Indian association football tournament

- Organiser(s): All India Football Federation (AIFF)
- Founded: 1992; 34 years ago
- Abolished: 1997
- Region: India
- Teams: Various
- Last champions: West Riffa Club (1997)
- Most championships: Dempo (3 titles)

The Scissors Cup was an Indian football tournament held in Kerala, organized by the All India Football Federation (AIFF). It was instituted in 1992 and abolished in 1997. It was organised in various stadiums in Kochi.

== Results ==
Year	Winners	Score	Runners-up	Notes
1992	Dempo	2–1	ITI	
1993	Mohun Bagan	1–0	Kerala Police	
1994	Dempo	3–0	Mohun Bagan	
1995	JCT	1–0	(Malaysia) Perlis	
1996	Dempo	1–0	Indian Bank	
1997	(Bahrain) West Riffa	–	Kochin	Riffa won by toss as power cut in Stadium

== See also ==
- Football in India
- Football in Kerala
