= 1993 Indian Federation Cup =

17th edition of the Federation Cup

1993 Federation Cup
Bharat Petroleum Federation Cup

Tournament details
- Country: India
- Dates: 11–28 April 1993
- Teams: 8

Final positions
- Champions: Mohun Bagan (8th title)
- Runners-up: Mahindra & Mahindra
- Asian Club Championship: Mohun Bagan

The 1993 Indian Federation Cup (known as Bharat Petroleum Federation Cup for sponsorship reasons) was the 17th season of the Federation Cup, a football competition. The competition was won by Mohun Bagan, who defeated Mahindra & Mahindra 1–0 in the final.

== Group stage ==
=== Group A ===
Team	Pld	W	D	L	GF	GA	GD	Pts
Mohun Bagan	3	1	2	0	2	1	+1	4
East Bengal	3	1	2	0	1	0	+1	4
Southern Railway	3	1	1	1	2	2	0	3
Indian Telephone Industries Limited	3	0	1	2	0	2	−2	1

==== Matches ====
- Mohun Bagan 0–0 East Bengal
- Mohun Bagan 1–1 Southern Railway
- Mohun Bagan 1–0 Indian Telephone Industries Limited
- East Bengal 1–0 Southern Railway
- East Bengal 0–0 Indian Telephone Industries Limited
- Southern Railway 1–0 Indian Telephone Industries Limited

=== Group B ===
Team	Pld	W	D	L	GF	GA	GD	Pts
Mahindra & Mahindra	3	1	2	0	3	0	+3	4
Kerala Police	3	1	2	0	2	0	+2	4
Churchill Brothers	3	1	1	1	3	3	0	3
Titanium	3	0	1	2	0	5	−5	1

==== Matches ====
- Mahindra & Mahindra 0–0 Kerala Police
- Mahindra & Mahindra 3–0 Churchill Brothers
- Mahindra & Mahindra 0–0 Titanium
- Kerala Police 0–0 Churchill Brothers
- Kerala Police 2–0 Titanium
- Churchill Brothers 3–0 Titanium

== Semi-finals ==
25 April 1993

Mohun Bagan	1–0	Kerala Police
Oparanozie 63'	Report

Corporation Stadium, Kozhikode

26 April 1993

Mahindra & Mahindra	0–0 (a.e.t.)	East Bengal
	Report
Penalties
Gunbir Singh (penalty scored); Shaiza (penalty scored); Antao (penalty scored); Menezes (penalty scored)	4–2	(penalty scored) Mushtaq Ali; (penalty scored) Subir Ghosh; (penalty missed) Bhutia; (penalty missed) Roy

Corporation Stadium, Kozhikode

== Final ==
28 April 1993

Mohun Bagan	1–0	Mahindra & Mahindra
V. P. Sathyan 39'	Report

Corporation Stadium, Kozhikode
Referee: Mamu Koya (Kerala)

GK	(India) Hemanta Dora
RB	(India) Mastan Ahmed
CB	(India) Achintya Belel
CB	(India) Sukanta Laha
LB	(India) Murshed Ali
RM	(India) Babu Mani
CM	(India) Bikash Panji
LM	(India) V. P. Sathyan
RW	(India) Satyajit Chatterjee	(substituted off) 54'
LW	(India) Chayan Bhawal	(substituted off) 33'
CF	(Nigeria) Bernard Opara
Substitutes:
RW	(India) Arif Ansari	(substituted on) 54'
LW	(India) Sukhen Sengupta	(substituted on) 33'

GK	(India) Henry Menezes	(substituted off) 46'
LB	(India) Lachman
CB	(India) Ramesh
CB	(India) Kumar
RB	(India) Seby Antao
RM	(India) Farooq Ahmed
CM	(India) Manoj Bhatt
LM	(India) Gunabir Singh
RW	(India) Jowel Bey
LW	(India) P.J. Jose
CF	(India) Santosh Kashyap	(substituted off) 68'
Substitutes:
GK	(India) Mohammed Kadeer	(substituted on) 46'
CF	(India) Schaiza	(substituted on) 68'
