= 2018 AIFF Super Cup final =

2018 Super Cup final
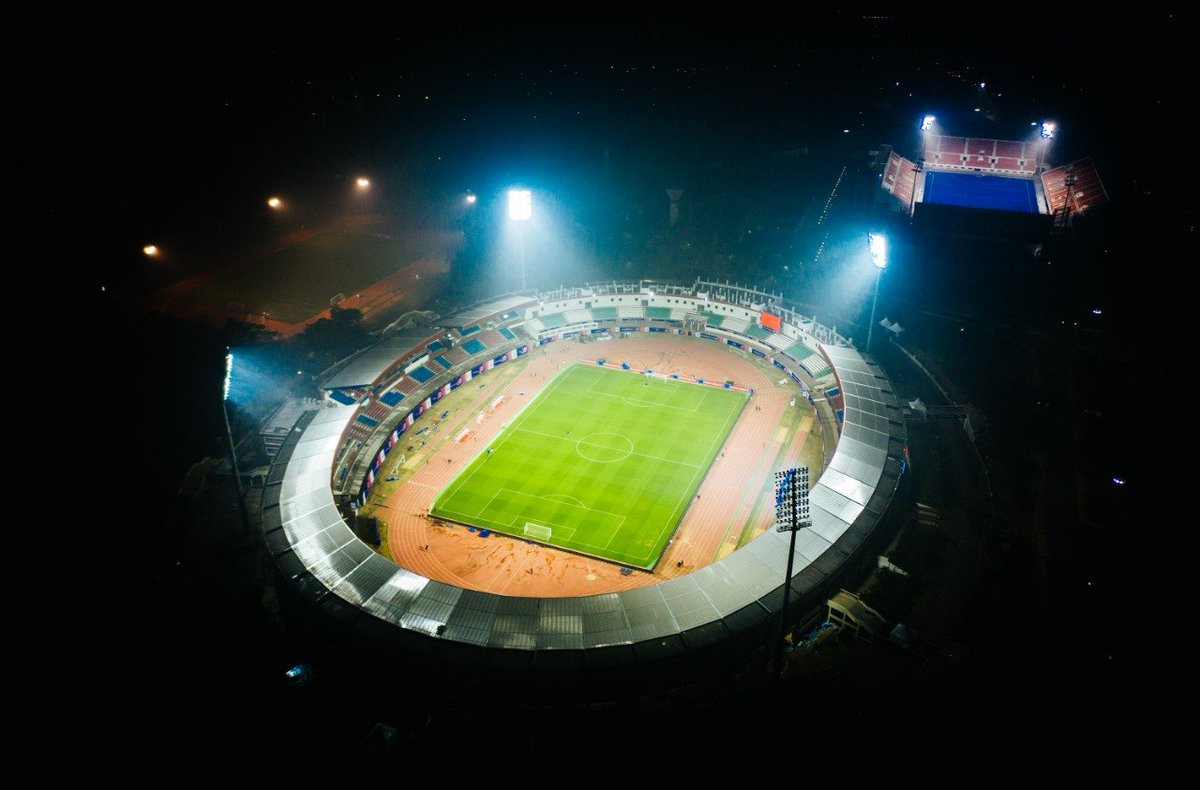
- Kalinga Stadium hosted the match
- Event: 2018 Indian Super Cup
East Bengal	Bengaluru
1	4
- Date: 20 April 2018
- Venue: Kalinga Stadium, Bhubaneswar
- Hero of the Match: Sunil Chhetri (Bengaluru)
- Referee: C. R. Srikrishna
- Attendance: 9,500
- Weather: Partly cloudy 32 °C (90 °F)

The 2018 Super Cup final was the final match of the 2018 Super Cup, the inaugural edition of the Super Cup, replacing the Federation Cup as the national knockout football competition in India. It was played at Kalinga Stadium in Bhubaneswar on 20 April 2018 between East Bengal and Bengaluru.

Bengaluru won the match 4–1 for their third national cup title.

== Road to the final ==
The Super Cup is a new annual Indian knock-out football competition that is open to all ten teams in the I-League and Indian Super League and is run by the All India Football Federation. The tournament is a replacement for the Federation Cup, the previous domestic competition for Indian football.

The top six teams in both leagues during their 2017–18 seasons automatically qualified for the competition. The bottom four from each league had to go through a qualification stage. East Bengal finished in fourth in the I-League and thus qualified directly for the Super Cup. Bengaluru meanwhile finished in first during the Indian Super League but ended as runners-up after losing in the final.

=== East Bengal ===
Prior to the 2018 Indian Super Cup, East Bengal had reached the final of the Federation Cup, India's previous top domestic cup competition, 16 times and won the tournament eight times. Most recently, East Bengal won the competition in 2012. They began their Super Cup campaign on 5 April 2018 against Indian Super League side Mumbai City. Mumbai City took an early lead in the 22nd minute through Achille Emaná before Katsumi Yusa scored an equalizer for East Bengal four minutes later. East Bengal then took the lead in the 73rd minute through Mahmoud Amnah and went on to win the match 2–1. In the quarter-final, the club took on fellow I-League side Aizawl. The match was a highly contested and was only won six minutes into second half stoppage time from a Laldanmawia Ralte penalty. East Bengal won 1–0.

In the semi-finals, East Bengal again took on an Indian Super League when they faced off against Goa. Goa entered the match heavily depleted after losing three players through suspension in their last match while also not having some players due to injury. With that the case, East Bengal managed to secure a 1–0 victory and confirm their place in the Super Cup Final with Dudu Omagbemi scoring in the 78th minute.

=== Bengaluru ===
Bengaluru had competed in the Federation Cup only four times as the club was only founded in 2013. In those four appearances, the club managed to win the competition twice, in 2014–15 and the last edition of the tournament in 2016–17. Bengaluru began their Super Cup campaign on 1 April 2018 against the Gokulam Kerala. Henry Kisekka began the scoring in the match for Gokulam Kerala in the 33rd minute. Bengaluru soon found an equalizer through Miku before Udanta Singh found the winner for the club two minutes into stoppage time. The club then went to take on NEROCA in the quarter-finals on 13 April. Bengaluru captain Sunil Chhetri scored a hattrick as he helped his side secure a 3–1 victory over their I-League opponents.

In the semi-finals, Bengaluru took on Mohun Bagan, the club they defeated in the Federation Cup final in 2017. During the match, Bengaluru found themselves down at halftime after Aser Pierrick Dipanda scored in the 42nd minute. However, second half saw Bengaluru respond with four goals, three from Miku and one from Chhetri, as they took a 4–1 lead. Dipanda then scored a second for Mohun Bagan in stoppage time but it was too late as Bengaluru won and clinched their spot in the final with a 4–2 victory.

== Pre-match ==
=== Venue ===
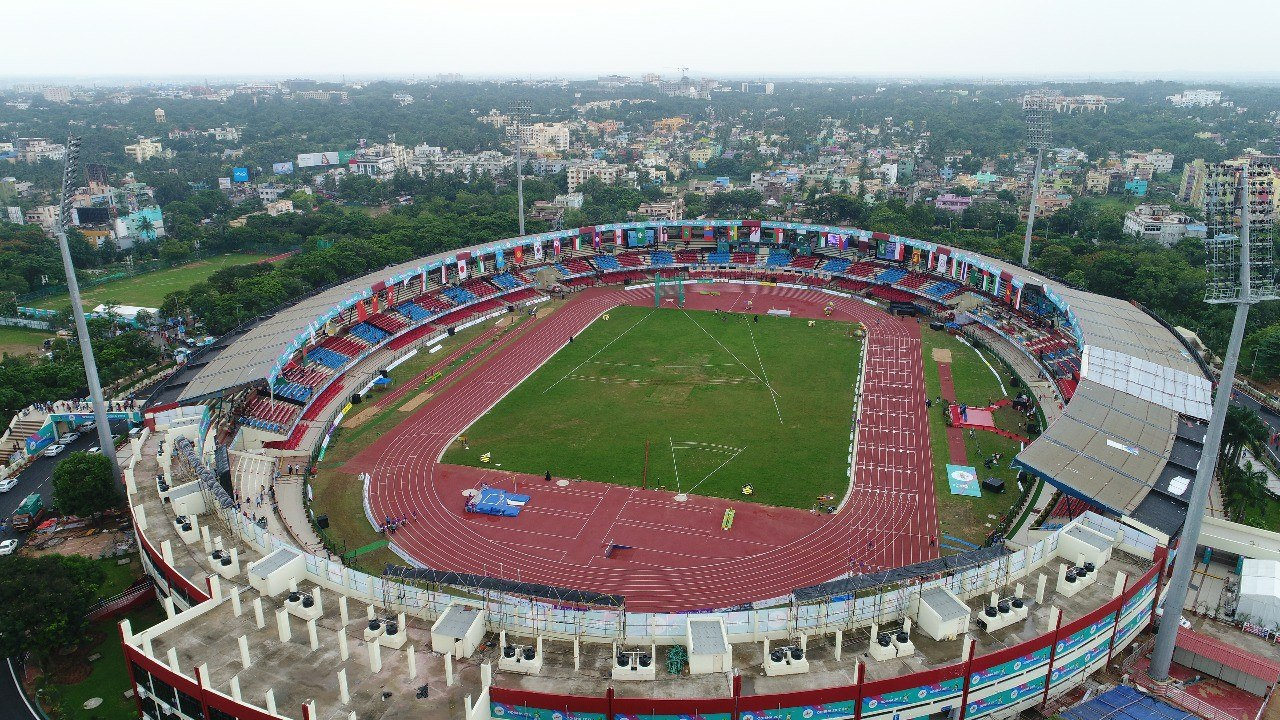
Kalinga Stadium in Bhubaneswar

On 7 March 2018, it was announced by the All India Football Federation that the Kalinga Stadium in Bhubaneswar, Odisha would host the entire Super Cup. The venue had not previously hosted any edition of the Federation Cup. In addition, none of the 20 teams that participated in the Super Cup were based in Bhubaneswar or the entire state of Odisha. However, Jamshedpur, one of the Indian Super League clubs did play one match at the stadium towards the end of the 2017–18 ISL season.

Originally, the entire tournament was set to take place in Kochi, Kerala. On 4 March 2018, a couple weeks before the Super Cup qualifiers, Jamshedpur head coach Steve Coppell had told the media that all he knew about the tournament was that it would take place in Kochi. However, when AIFF officials inspected the Kalinga Stadium during the Jamshedpur match in February, they were impressed with the facilities around the stadium.

=== Analysis ===
Coming into this match, both sides looked at it as a chance to win some silverware after they both lucked out in their respective league campaigns. Since Bengaluru had finished as runners-up during the Indian Super League, they were considered favorites. Albert Roca, the Bengaluru head coach, stressed before the match that their hunger and confidence would help them in this match: "The Super Cup final is another chance and we will be going into the game with the right amount of confidence. We've been consistent and have had a fantastic season so far. It would be nice to have a trophy for our efforts." According to Goal.com, the club were expected to enter the match using a 3–5–2 formation, with key players Sunil Chhetri and Miku leading the attack. Left back Nishu Kumar would be suspended for this match after gaining a red card in the previous match while defenders Rahul Bheke and Juanan were doubts to play.

Khalid Jamil, the East Bengal head coach, said that his team must remain positive before the match and apprehensive of Bengaluru. "It is the last match of the season. Bengaluru FC is a great team, no doubt. We cannot afford to make mistakes," he said. East Bengal centerback, Eduardo Ferreira, meanwhile made some comments to the media as he was part of the Mohun Bagan side which took on Bengaluru in the final of the Federation Cup in 2017: "I know they have good players and a good coach. One of the best teams in the country. But we have to keep focus and play well. Last year's Fed Cup final is past. I am thinking about tomorrow's game. I want to give my best tomorrow."

According to Goal.com, East Bengal were expected to enter the match using a 4–1–4–1 formation. Midfielder Mohammed Rafique would be unavailable due to injury and striker Dudu Omagbemi was a doubt.

== Match ==
=== Summary ===
Prior to the match, it was announced that both Juanan and Rahul Bheke had passed fitness tests and were starting for Bengaluru. For East Bengal, Dudu Omagbemi wasn't fit enough for the starting eleven but was on the bench. Within the first minute of the match, Bengaluru had earned a corner kick before East Bengal were able to get their first attack at Bengaluru. East Bengal's Ansumana Kromah was able to draw a foul outside the box and Bengaluru's Gurpreet Singh Sandhu and John Johnson were both given yellow cards. Kromah would eventually find the opening goal of the match in the 27th minute. Sandhu made a mistake on a corner as Kromah scored off a bicycle kick. The lead would only last for 12 minutes though as Bengaluru soon equalized through Rahul Bheke's header off a Víctor Pérez cross. Finally, before halftime, East Bengal's Samad Ali Mallick was sent off after attempting to punch Subhasish Bose, reducing the club to 10 men.

During the second half, East Bengal began putting the pressure on Bengaluru and scored a goal. Unfortunately, the goal scored by Kromah was judged to be offside after the Liberian striker attempted to put in a rebound after Sandhu saved a shot from Cavin Lobo. A few minutes later, Sandhu comes up big for Bengaluru after saving a free kick shot from Mahmoud Amnah. Later, in the 69th minute, a foul in East Bengal's box resulted in the referee awarding Bengaluru a penalty which was scored by Sunil Chhetri. Two minutes later, Bengaluru extended their lead when Miku scored his 20th goal in all competitions for the season. Finally, in the first minute of stoppage time, Chhetri wrapped the game up for Bengaluru by heading home the club's fourth goal and sealing a 4–1 victory.

=== Details ===
20 April 2018
16:00 IST

East Bengal	1–4	Bengaluru
Kromah 28'	Report	Bheke 39'; Chhetri 69' (pen.), 90+1'; Miku 71'

Kalinga Stadium, Bhubaneswar
Attendance: 9,500
Referee: C. R. Srikrishna

East Bengal	Bengaluru

GK	1	(India) Ubaid CK
DF	4	(India) Lalramchullova
DF	14	(Equatorial Guinea) Eduardo Ferreira
DF	16	(India) Gurwinder Singh
DF	25	(India) Samad Ali Mallick	(red card) 45+2'
MF	5	(Uganda) Khalid Aucho
MF	6	(Syria) Mahmoud Amnah
MF	7	(India) Cavin Lobo		(substituted off) 52'
MF	10	(Japan) Katsumi Yusa
MF	17	(India) Laldanmawia Ralte		(substituted off) 84'
FW	40	(Liberia) Ansumana Kromah		(substituted off) 89'
Substitutes:
DF	3	(India) Arnab Mondal
MF	11	(India) Gabriel Fernandes
GK	12	(India) Luis Barreto
FW	22	(India) Jobby Justin		(substituted in) 84'
MF	29	(India) Deepak Kumar		(substituted in) 52'
MF	30	(India) Brandon Vanlalremdika
FW	44	(Nigeria) Dudu Omagbemi		(substituted in) 89'
Manager:
(India) Khalid Jamil

GK	1	(India) Gurpreet Singh Sandhu
DF	2	(India) Rahul Bheke
DF	5	(Spain) Juanan
DF	6	(England) John Johnson
DF	15	(India) Subhasish Bose
MF	16	(Australia) Erik Paartalu	(substituted off) 61'
MF	8	(India) Lenny Rodrigues
MF	21	(India) Udanta Singh	(substituted off) 90+1'
MF	44	(Spain) Víctor Pérez
FW	11	(India) Sunil Chhetri
FW	7	(Venezuela) Miku
Substitutes:
GK	28	(India) Lalthuammawia Ralte
DF	10	(India) Harmanjot Khabra
DF	4	(India) Zohmingliana Ralte
MF	19	(Spain) Toni Dovale	(substituted in) 61'
MF	17	(India) Boithang Haokip	(substituted in) 90+1'
FW	25	(India) Daniel Lalhlimpuia
FW	18	(India) Thongkhosiem Haokip
Manager:
(Spain) Albert Roca

Hero of the Match:
Sunil Chhetri (Bengaluru)

Assistant referees:
Antony Abraham
Sumanta Dutta
Fourth official:
Santosh Kumar

Match rules

- 90 minutes.
- 30 minutes of extra time if necessary.
- Penalty shoot-out if scores still level.

== Post-match ==
During the post-match press conference, Bengaluru head coach Albert Roca praised his team and said that they were the most consistent side during the entire season. Roca also expressed his happiness in winning the tournament for the fans while praising how his team reacted to being a goal down, "I am very happy for the supporters. This is the success we were looking forward to. Today we showed that my team has been the most consistent team this season." The club would soon resume their season five days later when they took on New Radiant of the Maldives in the AFC Cup.

Khalid Jamil after the match meanwhile praised his side, "Talking about this game, everybody worked very hard. I give all the credit to boys. They started well. The score wasn’t in our favour. No complaint from my side." Jamil was also very critical of the refereeing performance during the match, especially during Samad Ali Mallick's red card and Ansumana Kromah's disallowed goal. "Kromah’s goal, I don’t think it was offside. The result could have been different if Kromah's goal was not disallowed. Samad Ali’s red card was harsh, it could have been a yellow card. But I was far away and I couldn’t see properly." Six days later, on 26 April, it was announced by East Bengal that Jamil had been sacked by the club.
