= Carles Cuadrat =

Spanish footballer and manager (born 1968)

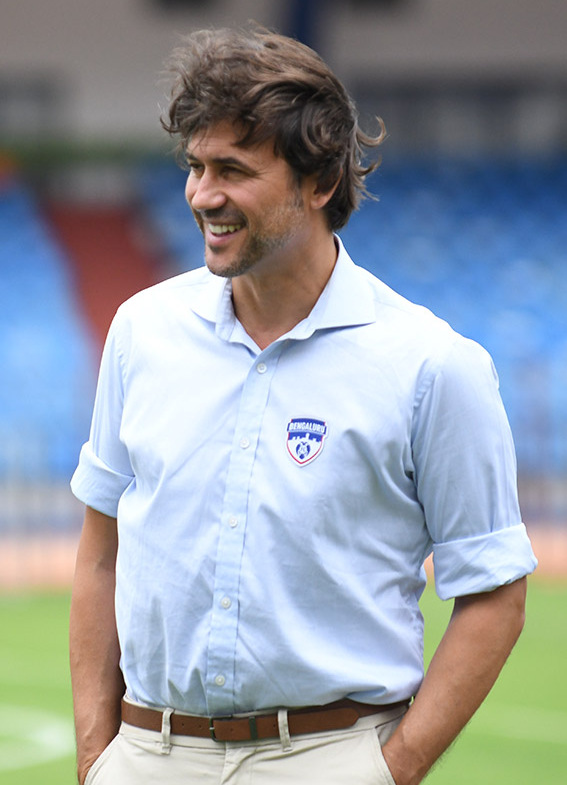
- Cuadrat with Bengaluru in 2018

Personal information
- Full name: Carles Cuadrat Xiqués
- Date of birth: 28 October 1968 (age 58)
- Place of birth: Barcelona, Spain
- Position: Left-back

Team information
- Current team: Philippines (head coach)

Youth career
- 1978–1988: Barcelona

Senior career*
Years	Team	Apps	(Gls)
1987–1988	Barcelona C	38	(4)
1988–1989	Barcelona B	42	(6)
1989–1996	Gavà	224	(40)
1996–1997	Sabadell	36	(4)
1997–1998	Gavà	30	(2)
Total		370	(56)

International career
1985–1988	Spain U18	18	(4)

Managerial career
- 2018–2021: Bengaluru
- 2023–2024: East Bengal
- 2025–: Philippines
- * Club domestic league appearances and goals

Carles Cuadrat Xiqués (born 28 October 1968) is a Spanish professional football manager and former player who played as a left-back. He is the head coach of the Philippines national team.

Cuadrat was a defender who spent most of his career with Spanish club Gavà. He also played for Sabadell and the Barcelona reserve teams as well as the Spanish national youth teams.

After retiring as a player, Cuadrat started working as a conditioning coach with various Barcelona teams from 1998 to 2005. He also played the same role in Galatasaray and Saudi Arabia national team from 2008 to 2013. In 2014, he joined El Salvador national team as an assistant coach. In 2016, Cuadrat joined Indian club Bengaluru as an assistant coach to Albert Roca and later appointed as the head coach in 2018. He won the Indian Super League with the club.

After assistant coaching spells at Aris Limassol and Midtjylland, Cuadrat joined East Bengal in 2023, where he won the 2024 Super Cup. However, following a poor start to the 2024–25 season, Cuadrat resigned as head coach.

== Playing career ==
Born in Barcelona, Catalonia, Cuadrat played for various clubs in the Spanish second division. He joined La Masia at age of ten in 1978. He played for all the Barcelona youth teams between 1978 and 1988. Cuadrat was also part of the Barcelona side that won the U19 Spanish Cup in 1986 and 1987. In 1988, Cuadrat played for Barcelona's first team in couple of friendlies under then head coach Luis Aragones, alongside the likes of Gary Lineker and Bernd Schuster at the Camp Nou. He played fourteen times for Spanish national youth teams (U15 & U18) during his youth years most notably finishing third in the 1985 UEFA European Under-16 Championship.

Cuadrat played for Catalonian clubs Barcelona B, Gavà and Sabadell in the Segunda División B between 1988 and 1998. With his playing career cut short by injury in 1998 at the age of 30, Cuadrat began working as a Physical Coach for the Barcelona Youth Academy.

== Managerial career ==
During his second stint as a player at Gavà, he also worked as director at Gavà Youth Academy between 1995 and 1998. In 1998, he joined the Barcelona under–15 team as assistant and physical coach under Albert Benaiges. He worked as coach and physical trainer for various Barcelona youth teams in years followed.

In 2009, Cuadrat joined former Barcelona manager Frank Rijkaard's technical staff as a physical trainer at the Turkish giants Galatasaray. He was also in the technical staff Rijkaard at Saudi Arabia between 2011 and 2013. In 2014, when Albert Roca, who was assistant coach to Frank Rijkaard at Galatasaray and Saudi Arabia, became manager of El Salvador, he enlisted service of Cuadrat as assistant coach. Cuadrat, 54, began his coaching career in India in 2016 as the Assistant Coach of Bengaluru FC (BFC). He moved to then I-League side Bengalaru, who moved to the Indian Super League in 2017, with Roca in 2016 as an assistant coach. During his two-year stint, the club won the Federation Cup in 2017, Super Cup in 2018 apart from being the first Indian side to reach the AFC Cup final in 2016. On 29 December 2017 Carles Cuadrat parted ways with the club by mutual consent owing to health concerns.

After Albert Roca's departure as head coach at the end of 2017–18 season, Bengaluru appointed Cuadrat as head coach for 2018–19 season. He led them to their maiden Indian Super League title in his first season as head coach. Having won the 2018–19 Indian Super League final 1–0 against Goa, Cuadrat's Bengalaru side became the only team in the history of the League to have finished in first place in the regular league and win the title in the same year.

In 2019–20, Cuadrat took the team back to the playoffs in the Indian Super League for a third consecutive season, being the only club in the Indian Super League to reach the playoff in every appearance. The feat also made Bengalaru the first team to reach the playoff as defending champions, since ATK in the 2015–16 edition of the tournament. The defending champions had failed to make it to the top four the following season, with ATK (in 2015) and Bengalaru (in 2020) the only teams to do so. However, it was ATK that stopped Bengaluru's charge to the final with an aggregate win of 3–2 in the playoffs. The Kolkata side would go on to claim the title, winning 3–1 against Chennaiyin in the final.

Under Cuadrat, Bengaluru has set many Indian Super League and club records:

1. In 2018–19, an 11-match unbeaten run made Bengalaru the team with the longest unbeaten streak in the Indian Super League.
2. In 2018–19, Bengaluru won six matches in a row, another feat unmatched in the Indian Super League.
3. Gurpreet Singh Sandhu's eleven clean sheets in the 2019–20 season means that Bengaluru hold the League record for most clean sheets in a single season.
4. From December 2017 to December 2019, Bengaluru went a League-record 17 matches unbeaten at the Sree Kanteerava Stadium, the longest such run in the Indian Super League.
5. Cuadrat's side went 385 minutes without conceding a goal at home, with Goa's 61st-minute strike on 3 January followed by ATK's 86th-minute goal on 22 February, over a run of four League games.
6. Bengaluru's biggest ever win was recorded under Carles Cuadrat in the 2019–20 campaign when the Blues beat Paros 9–1 at the Kanteerava in the AFC Cup qualifiers.

On 6 January 2021, it was announced that Carles Cuadrat and Bengalaru had parted ways on mutual consent.

In the 2021–2022 season, he joined the recently promoted Aris Limassol (founded in 1930) of Cyprus, achieving with the team best season of their history, qualifying for the first time for the play-off for the title and getting a place in UEFA European competition, also for the first time in the history of the club.

In January 2022, Cuadrat signed for danish club Midtjylland as an assistant of Albert Capellas. The club plays his best ever european season getting in front of Lazio and Sturm Graz in the Europa League group stage, and only getting out of the competition in the knock out playoffs against Sporting Lisboa. Midtjylland finished the 2022-23 season by once again qualifying for a UEFA competition.

On 25 April 2023, Cuadrat was announced as the head coach for the Indian Super League side East Bengal, where he signed a two year contract from 2023. He is one of the most successful managers in Indian club football history.

In his first month, he achieved two historic milestones: reaching the final of the prestigious Durand Cup after 19 years without doing so, and winning the local derby against Mohun Bagan after more than four years and nine games without doing so. Before finishing the first round of the Indian Super League, Cuadrat had already achieved a third record; East Bengal recorded their biggest ever victory in the Indian Super League (ISL), a 5-0 triumph over NorthEast United. On 28 January 2024, East Bengal won their first ever Indian Super Cup as an unbeaten champion under Cuadrat's coaching, ending a 12-year trophy drought. The Red and Gold Brigade beat Odisha 3-2 in extra time at the Kalinga Stadium in Bhubaneshwar.

After starting the second season with two consecutive victories in the Durand Cup, the team failed to make it past the preliminary round of the AFC Champions League after losing to Turkmenistan's Altyn Asir, but despite the defeat they qualified directly for the group stage of the AFC Challenge League. In this way, Cuadrat returned the club to a continental competition after nine years for the Kolkata-based club without participating.

A bad losing streak at the start of the 11th edition of the Indian Super League led Cuadrat to step aside as head of the team on September 30, 2024.

On 21 March 2025, it was announced that Cuadrat had agreed to become the assistant coach of the Philippines national football team. Following the departure of head coach Albert Capellas for personal reasons, Cuadrat took over as the interim head coach; later on, he became the permanent coach.

== Managerial statistics ==
As of match played 2 October 2026

Managerial record by team and tenure
Team	Nat.	From	To	Record								Ref.
Team	Nat.	From	To	G	W	D	L	GF	GA	GD	Win %	Ref.
Bengaluru	(India)	14 June 2018	6 January 2021	57	27	13	17	87	64	+23	47.37	
East Bengal	(India)	26 April 2023	30 September 2024	40	16	8	16	60	54	+6	40.00	
Philippines	(Philippines)	1 June 2025	Present	14	7	3	4	31	18	+13	50.00	
Career Total				111	50	24	37	178	136	+42	45.05	

== Honours ==
=== Player ===
Spain U16

- UEFA European Under-16 Championship third-place: 1985

=== Manager ===
Bengaluru

- Indian Super League: 2018–19

East Bengal

- Super Cup: 2024
- Durand Cup runner-up: 2023
