= 1985 Indian Federation Cup =

9th edition of the Federation Cup

1985 Federation Cup
Tournament details
- Country: India
- Teams: 16

Final positions
- Champions: East Bengal (3rd title)
- Runners-up: Mohun Bagan
- Asian Club Championship: East Bengal

The 1985 Indian Federation Cup was the 9th season of the football competition. The competition was won by East Bengal, who defeated local rivals Mohun Bagan 1–0 at Bangalore.

== Group stage ==
=== Group A ===
| Team | Pld | W | D | L | GF | GA | GD | Pts |
|---|---|---|---|---|---|---|---|---|
| Salgaocar | 3 | 3 | 0 | 0 | 6 | 2 | +4 | 6 |
| Indian Telephone | 3 | 2 | 0 | 1 | 3 | 3 | 0 | 4 |
| Titanium | 3 | 0 | 1 | 2 | 3 | 5 | −2 | 1 |
| Tata | 3 | 0 | 1 | 2 | 2 | 4 | −2 | 1 |

Source: rsssf.com

=== Group B ===
| Team | Pld | W | D | L | GF | GA | GD | Pts |
|---|---|---|---|---|---|---|---|---|
| Punjab SEB | 3 | 1 | 2 | 0 | 3 | 1 | +2 | 4 |
| Mohammedan | 3 | 1 | 2 | 0 | 2 | 1 | +1 | 4 |
| Dempo | 3 | 1 | 1 | 1 | 4 | 4 | 0 | 3 |
| CIL | 3 | 0 | 1 | 2 | 1 | 6 | −5 | 1 |

Source: rsssf.com

=== Group C ===
| Team | Pld | W | D | L | GF | GA | GD | Pts |
|---|---|---|---|---|---|---|---|---|
| Mohun Bagan | 3 | 3 | 0 | 0 | 10 | 0 | +10 | 6 |
| SESA | 3 | 1 | 1 | 1 | 7 | 5 | +2 | 3 |
| Madura Coats | 3 | 1 | 0 | 2 | 5 | 7 | −2 | 2 |
| Integral Coach Factory | 3 | 0 | 1 | 2 | 1 | 11 | −10 | 1 |

Source: rsssf.com

=== Group D ===
| Team | Pld | W | D | L | GF | GA | GD | Pts |
|---|---|---|---|---|---|---|---|---|
| East Bengal | 3 | 3 | 0 | 0 | 5 | 0 | +5 | 6 |
| HAL | 3 | 2 | 0 | 1 | 5 | 4 | +1 | 4 |
| Central Excise Cochin | 3 | 1 | 0 | 2 | 5 | 4 | +1 | 2 |
| JCT Mills | 3 | 0 | 0 | 3 | 0 | 7 | −7 | 0 |

Source: rsssf.com

== Semi-finals ==
| Team 1 | Aggregate | Team 2 | 1st Leg | 2nd Leg |
|---|---|---|---|---|
| Mohun Bagan | 1–1 (4–3 p) | Salgaocar | 0–0 | 1–1 |
| East Bengal | 2–1 | Punjab SEB | 2–0 | 0–1 |

== Final ==
| East Bengal | 1–0 (a.e.t.) | Mohun Bagan |
|---|---|---|
| Nassiri 102' | Report |
