= ITI Sports Club =

Association football club in Bangalore, India

- Full name: Indian Telephone Industries Sports Club
- Nicknames: ITI; ITI SC
- Founded: 1952; 74 years ago
- Dissolved: 2003; 23 years ago
- Ground: Various
- Owner: ITI Limited

Indian Telephone Industries Sports Club was an institutional association football club based in Bangalore, India.

== History ==
ITI Sports Club was founded in 1952. The club disbanded in 2003.

== Honours ==
=== League ===
- BDFA A Division
  - Champions (6): 1994–95, 1995–96, 1996–97, 1997–98, 1998–99, 1999–00

=== Cup ===
- Federation Cup
  - Champions (1): 1977–78
- Stafford Challenge Cup
  - Champions (1): 1993
  - Runners-up (2): 1979, 1980
- Bandodkar Gold Trophy
  - Runners-up (1): 1983
- Scissors Cup
  - Runners-up (1): 1992
