= Federation Cup (India) =

Association football tournament in India

- Organiser(s): All India Football Federation
- Founded: 1977; 49 years ago
- Region: India
- Related competitions: Indian Super League; Indian Football League
- Domestic cup: Durand Cup
- Most championships: Mohun Bagan (14 titles)
- Motto: Where Pride Meets Passion
- 2027

The Federation Cup, known as the (AIFF) Super Cup (2018–2026) is a knockout football competition in men's domestic Indian football league system. It is organized by the All India Football Federation (AIFF).

== History ==
In 1977, the All India Football Federation started the Federation Cup as the first club based national tournament in the country. Inaugural champion of the competition was the ITI (Indian Telephone Industries) who defeated Mohun Bagan in the final. In 2015, the All India Football Federation announced that the Federation Cup will be put on hold to avoid scheduling conflict with the Indian Super League and the I-League. After the Asian Football Confederation mandated that a club must play at least 18 matches in the season, the AIFF decided to revive the tournament under new format.

On 19 February 2018, the All India Football Federation announced the creation of the Super Cup as a reformed Federation Cup. The qualifiers for the inaugural recherished tournament were held between 15–16 March. The tournament proper then commenced on 31 March and concluded with the final on 20 April 2018. Bengaluru emerged as the winners of the inaugural edition of the recherished tournament. They defeated East Bengal 4–1 in the final.

In the second edition, seven I-League clubs, namely Minerva Punjab, East Bengal, Mohun Bagan, NEROCA, Gokulam Kerala, Aizawl and Churchill Brothers withdrew from the competition citing "unfair treatment to I-League clubs by the AIFF."

From 2020 to 2022, the competition was suspended due to the COVID-19 pandemic. From the 2024 edition the competition is known as the Kalinga Super Cup, as part of the title sponsorship agreement with the Government of Odisha. In the 2025–26 edition, it was held in the initial phase of the season, after the Durand Cup, unlike previous editions.

On 2 March 2026, the AIFF released an RFP for commercial rights which included the Federation Cup, indicating a possible continuation of the competition.

== Competition format ==
Until 2019, the Super Cup's competition proper was a 16-club knockout tournament. In the event of a match being drawn after the group stage, the extra time was played, followed by a penalty shoot-out if required. In 2024, the competition comprised 16 clubs in group stage. All clubs in the top tier Indian Super League entered the group stage, and the I-League clubs played qualifiers for the four remaining spots. During the group stage, clubs were divided into four groups of four, playing against each other in a single round-robin format. At the end of the group stage, the club with the most points qualified to the semi-finals. The competition then culminated with the final to determine the champions, presented with the trophy and a spot in the AFC Champions League Two qualifiers. Matches during are usually held at neutral venues.

== Results ==
=== Federation Cup/Super Cup finals ===
Year	Winners	Winning coach	Runners-up	Runner-up coach	Score	Venue	Top scorer(s)
1977–78	Indian Telephone Industries		Mohun Bagan		1–0		
1978–79	Mohun Bagan and East Bengal		–		0–0		
1979–80	BSF		Mafatlal Mills		2–2, 3–0		
1980–81	Mohun Bagan (2) and East Bengal (2)		–		1–1		
1981–82	Mohun Bagan (3)		Mohammedan		2–0		
1982–83	Mohun Bagan (4)		Mafatlal Mills		1–0		
1983–84	Mohammedan		Mohun Bagan		0–0, 2–0		
1984–85	Mohammedan (2)		East Bengal		1–0		
1985	East Bengal (3)		Mohun Bagan		1–0		
1986–87	Mohun Bagan (5)		East Bengal		0–0 (a.e.t.) (5–4 p)		
1987–88	Mohun Bagan (6)		Salgaocar		2–0		
1988–89	Salgaocar		BSF		1–0		
1989–90	Salgaocar (2)		Mohammedan Sporting		2–1 (a.e.t.)		
1990	Kerala Police		Salgaocar		2–1		
1991	Kerala Police (2)		Mahindra & Mahindra		2–0 (a.e.t.)		
1992	Mohun Bagan (7)		East Bengal		2–0		
1993	Mohun Bagan (8)		Mahindra & Mahindra		1–0		
1994	Mohun Bagan (9)		Salgaocar		0–0 (a.e.t.) (3–0 p)		
1995	JCT Mills		East Bengal		1–1 (a.e.t.) (7–6 p)		
1995–96	JCT Mills (2)		East Bengal		1–1 (a.e.t.) (5–3 p)		
1996	East Bengal (4)		Dempo		2–1		
1997	Salgaocar (3)		East Bengal		2–1		
1998	Mohun Bagan (10)		East Bengal		2–1		
1999	Not held						
2000	Not held						
2001	Mohun Bagan (11)		Dempo		2–1		
2002	Not held						
2003	Mahindra United		Mohammedan Sporting		1–0		
2004	Dempo	(India) Armando Colaco	Mohun Bagan		2–0	Bangalore Football Stadium, Bengaluru	(Brazil) Cristiano Junior (5)
2005	Mahindra United (2)		Sporting Goa		2–1		
2006	Mohun Bagan (12)		Sporting Goa		3–1		
2007	East Bengal (5)		Mahindra United		2–1		
2008	Mohun Bagan (13)	(Morocco) Karim Bencherifa	Dempo	(India) Armando Colaco	1–0	Salt Lake Stadium, Kolkata	
2009–10	East Bengal (6)	(Belgium) Philippe De Ridder	Shillong Lajong	(India) Stanley Rozario	0–0 (a.e.t.) (3–0 p)	Nehru Stadium, Guwahati	
2010	East Bengal (7)	(England) Trevor Morgan	Mohun Bagan	(India) Stanley Rozario	1–0	Barabati Stadium, Cuttack	(Nigeria) Ranti Martins (Nigeria) Muritala Ali (5)
2011	Salgaocar (4)	(Morocco) Karim Bencherifa	East Bengal	(England) Trevor Morgan	3–1	Salt Lake Stadium, Kolkata	(Gabon) Henry Antchouet (Nigeria) Chidi Edeh (4)
2012	East Bengal (8)	(England) Trevor Morgan	Dempo	(India) Armando Colaco	3–2 (a.e.t.)	Kanchenjunga Stadium, Siliguri	(Nigeria) Chidi Edeh (5)
2013–14	Churchill Brothers	(India) Mariano Dias	Sporting Goa	(Spain) Oscar Bruzon	3–1	Jawaharlal Nehru Stadium, Kochi	(India) Balwant Singh; (Trinidad and Tobago) Cornell Glen; (Nigeria) Koko Sakibo; (India) Victorino Fernandes; (Nigeria) Odafe Onyeka Okolie (4)
2014–15	Bengaluru	(England) Ashley Westwood	Dempo	(Australia) Arthur Papas	2–1	Fatorda Stadium, Goa	(India) Sunil Chhetri (Australia) Tolgay Özbey (6)
2015–16	Mohun Bagan (14)	(India) Sanjoy Sen	Aizawl	(India) Jahar Das	5–0	Indira Gandhi Stadium, Guwahati	(India) Jeje Lalpekhlua (8)
2016–17	Bengaluru (2)	(Spain) Albert Roca	Mohun Bagan	(India) Sanjoy Sen	2–0 (a.e.t.)	Barabati Stadium, Cuttack	(India) Balwant Singh (Scotland) Darryl Duffy (India) Laldanmawia Ralte (3)
2017–18	Replaced by Super Cup						
2018	Bengaluru (3)	(Spain) Albert Roca	East Bengal	(India) Khalid Jamil	4–1	Kalinga Stadium, Bhubaneswar	(India) Sunil Chhetri (6)
2019	Goa	(Spain) Sergio Lobera	Chennaiyin	(England) John Gregory	2–1	Kalinga Stadium, Bhubaneswar	(Spain) Coro (5)
2020–2022	Tournament suspended due to COVID-19 and India's international fixtures						
2023	Odisha	(India) Clifford Miranda	Bengaluru	(England) Simon Grayson	2–1	EMS Stadium, Kozhikode	(Colombia) Wilmar Jordán (7)
2024	East Bengal (9)	(Spain) Carles Cuadrat	Odisha	(Spain) Sergio Lobera	3–2	Kalinga Stadium, Bhubaneswar	(Brazil) Cleiton Silva (5)
2025	Goa (2)	(Spain) Manolo Márquez	Jamshedpur	(India) Khalid Jamil	3–0	Kalinga Stadium, Bhubaneswar	(Spain) Iker Guarrotxena (4) (Spain) Borja Herrera (4)
2025–26	Goa (3)	(Spain) Manolo Márquez	East Bengal	(Spain) Óscar Bruzón	0–0 (a.e.t.) (6–5 p)	Fatorda Stadium, Fatorda	(Spain) Koldo Obieta (3)

- a.e.t.: After extra time
- pen.: Score in penalty shootout

== Winners and finals appearances ==
Club	Finals appearances	Winner	Winning years	Runners-up	Runners-up years
Mohun Bagan	20	14	1978*, 1980*, 1981, 1982, 1986, 1987, 1992, 1993, 1994, 1998, 2001, 2006, 2008, 2015–16	6	1977, 1983, 1985, 2004, 2010, 2016–17
East Bengal	19	9	1978*, 1980*, 1985, 1996, 2007, 2009-10, 2010, 2012, 2024	10	1984, 1986, 1992, 1995, 1996–97, 1997, 1998, 2011, 2018, 2025–26
Salgaocar	7	4	1988, 1989, 1997, 2011	3	1987, 1990, 1994
Dempo	6	1	2004	5	1996#, 2001, 2008, 2012, 2014–15
Mohammedan	5	2	1983, 1984	3	1981, 1989, 2003
Mahindra United	5	2	2003, 2005	3	1991, 1993, 2007
Bengaluru	4	3	2014–15, 2016–17, 2018	1	2023
Goa	3	3	2019, 2025, 2025–26	0	
JCT Mills	2	2	1995, 1995–96	0	-
Kerala Police	2	2	1990, 1991	0	-
Border Security Force	2	1	1979	1	1988
Odisha	2	1	2023	1	2024
Indian Telephone Industries	1	1	1977	0	-
Churchill Brothers	1	1	2013–14	0	-

- *: Shared
- #: There were two federation cups in 1996

== Performance by club (Super Cup) ==
Club	Wins	Winning years	Runners-up	Total finals appearances
Goa	3	2019, 2025, 2025–26	0	3
Bengaluru	1	2018	1	2
Odisha	1	2023	1	2
East Bengal	1	2024	2	3

== Top goalscorers ==
=== Super Cup ===
Rank	Player	Goals	Apps	Years	Club(s)
1	(India) Sunil Chhetri	11	12	2018–2025	Bengaluru
2	(Colombia) Wilmar Jordán	8	7	2023–2024	NorthEast United, Punjab
2	(Brazil) Diego Maurício	8	10	2023–2024	Odisha
4	(Spain) Coro	7	7	2018–2019	Goa
4	(India) Nandhakumar Sekar	7	14	2023–2025	Odisha, East Bengal
6	(Liberia) Ansumana Kromah	6	8	2018–2023	East Bengal, Churchill Brothers
7	(Venezuela) Miku	5	5	2018–2019	Bengaluru
7	(Greece) Dimitrios Diamantakos	5	6	2023–2024	Kerala Blasters
7	(Brazil) Cleiton Silva	5	8	2023–2024	East Bengal

=== Federation Cup ===
As of 10 January 2015

Rank	Player	Goals
1	(Brazil) Jose Ramirez Barreto	27
2	(Nigeria) Chima Okorie	26*
3	(India) Bhaichung Bhutia	25
4	(Nigeria) Chidi Edeh	23
5	(Nigeria) Ranti Martins	18
6	(India) I. M. Vijayan	17
6	(Nigeria) Odafa Onyeka Okolie	17

(*: Includes 7 goals scored in Eastern Zone qualifiers at Sibsagar – 1990 Federation Cup)

== Sponsorship and media coverage (Super Cup) ==
=== Sponsorship ===
The title sponsor for the Super Cup was Hero MotoCorp until the 2023 edition. The next title sponsor was the Government of Odisha with the tournament being known as Kalinga Super Cup.

Period	Title sponsor	Tournament
2018–2023	Hero MotoCorp	Hero AIFF Super Cup
2024–2025	Government of Odisha Odisha Tourism	Kalinga AIFF Super Cup
2025–2026	none	AIFF Super Cup

=== Media coverage ===
Star Sports was the official broadcaster for the AIFF Super Cup, with all matches being broadcast on the channel, and JioHotstar was the official online streaming partner of the tournament. In 2023, Sony Sports and FanCode became the official media partners.

Television
Period	Broadcaster	Region
2018–2019	Star Sports	India, Afghanistan, Bangladesh, Bhutan, Maldives, Nepal, Pakistan, Sri Lanka
2018–2019	Fox Sports	Australia, Brunei, Cambodia, Hong Kong, Indonesia, Laos, Macau, Malaysia, Myanmar, Mongolia, Papua New Guinea, Philippines, Singapore, Taiwan, Thailand, Vietnam
2018–2019	ATN Channel	Canada
2018–2019	ESPN+	United States of America
2018–2019	OSN Sports	Algeria, Bahrain, Egypt, Iran, Iraq, Israel, Jordan, Kuwait, Lebanon, Libya, Morocco, Oman, Palestine, Qatar, Saudi Arabia, Syria, Tunisia, Turkey, United Arab Emirates, Yemen
2018–2019	Star Gold UK	England, Ireland, Northern Ireland, Scotland, Wales
2018–2019	SuperSport	South Africa, Sub-Saharan Africa
2018–2019	Eurosport	Europe
2018–2019	ESPN Africa	Parts of Africa
2024–2026	Star Sports	India

Online streaming
Period	Broadcaster	Region
2018–2019	Disney+ Hotstar	India
2018–2019	Disney+ Hotstar	Worldwide
2023	FanCode	India
2024	JioCinema	India
2025–2026	JioHotstar	India

== Prize money ==
Super Cup money distribution
Position/Award	Prize money (INR)
Champions	₹25,00,000
Runners-up	₹15,00,000
Best player	₹2,50,000
Golden boot	₹2,50,000

== See also ==
- History of Indian football
- Indian football league system
- Durand Cup
- I-League 2
- I-League 3
- Indian Super Cup (1997–2011)
- Indian State Leagues
- Institutional League
