= List of East Bengal FC coaches =

East Bengal Club is an Indian association football club based in Kolkata, West Bengal, which competes in the top tier of Indian football. The club was formed in August 1920 when the Jorabagan Club's vice-president, Suresh Chandra Chaudhuri, resigned. He did so after the club sent out their starting eleven with the notable exclusion of defender Sailesh Bose, when they were about to face Mohun Bagan in the Coochbehar Cup semi-final on 28 July 1920. He, along with Raja Manmatha Nath Chaudhuri, Ramesh Chandra Sen and Aurobinda Ghosh, formed East Bengal on 1 August 1920. East Bengal started playing in the Calcutta Football League, 2nd division, in 1921. In 1925, they qualified for the first division for the first time.

East Bengal joined the National Football League (NFL) at its inception in 1996 and is the only club to have played every season, including those after the rebranded I-League succeeded the NFL in 2007. East Bengal won the National Football League in 2000–01, 2002–03 and 2003–04 and were runners up seven times. Among other trophies, East Bengal has won the Calcutta Football League 39 times, the IFA Shield 28 times, the Federation Cup eight times and the Durand Cup 16 times.

There have been thirty-three permanent and nine caretaker coaches/managers of East Bengal since 1920; P. K. Banerjee has managed the club in five different spells, spanning nine seasons, having won thirty-one trophies, the most by anyone in the history of the club.

This chronological list comprises all those who have held the position of coach of the first team of East Bengal since their foundation in 1920. Each coach's entry includes his dates of tenure and the club's overall competitive record (in terms of matches won, drawn and lost), honours won and significant achievements while under his care. Caretaker coaches are included, where known, as well as those who have been in permanent charge.

== Coaching history ==
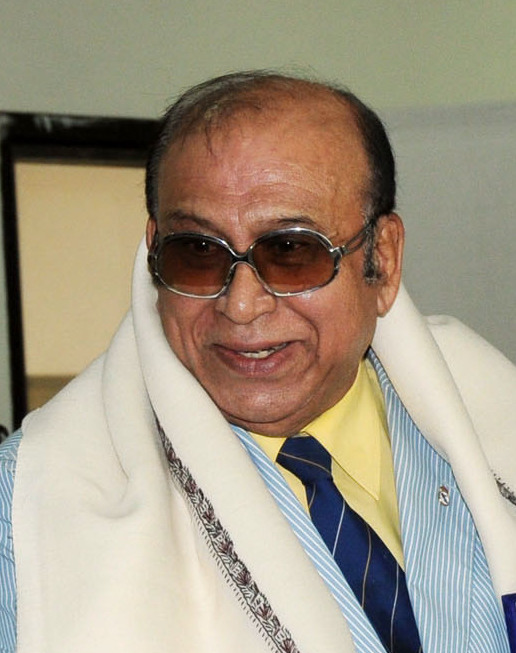
P. K. Banerjee in 2011

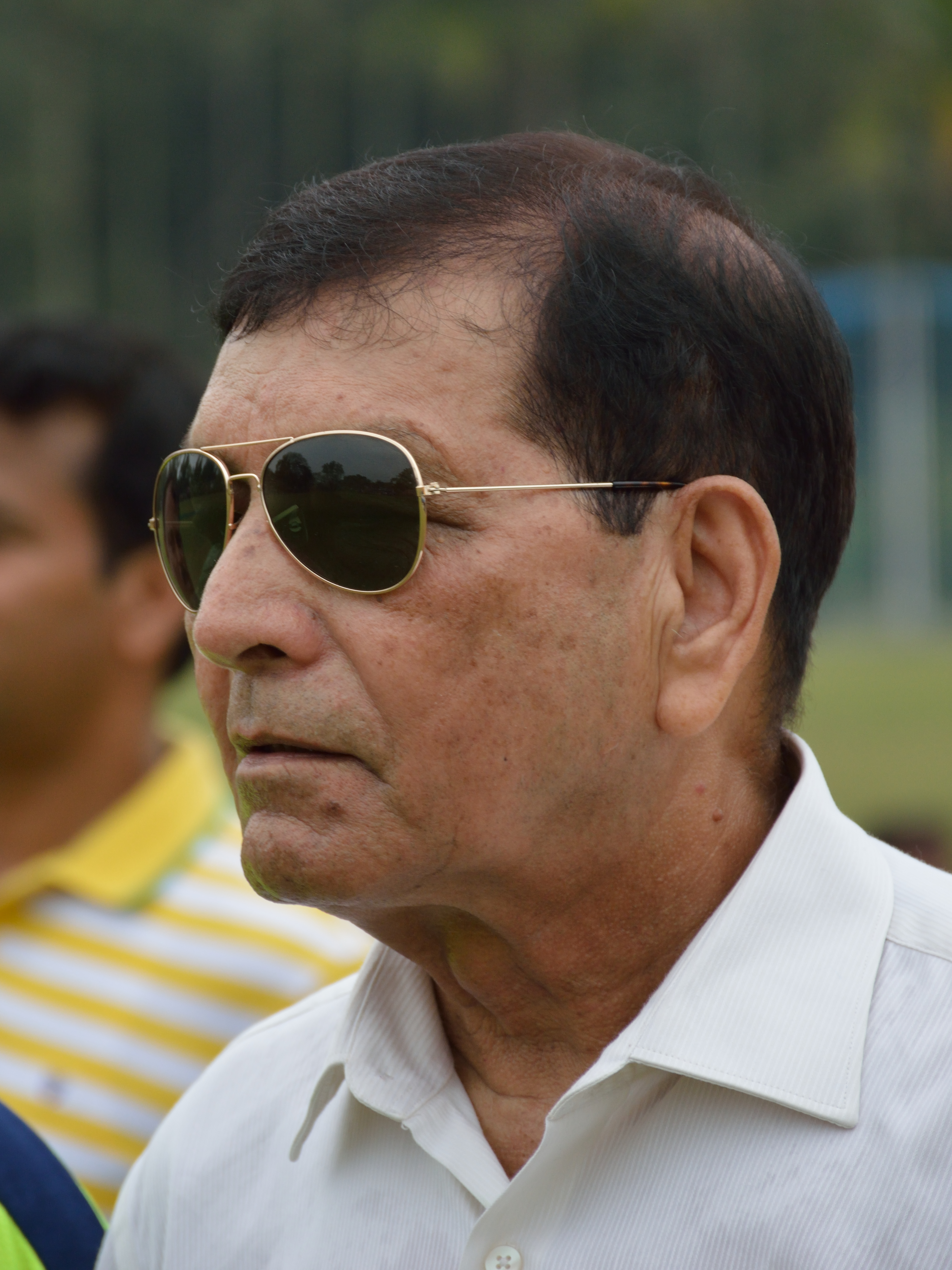
Syed Nayeemuddin in 2016

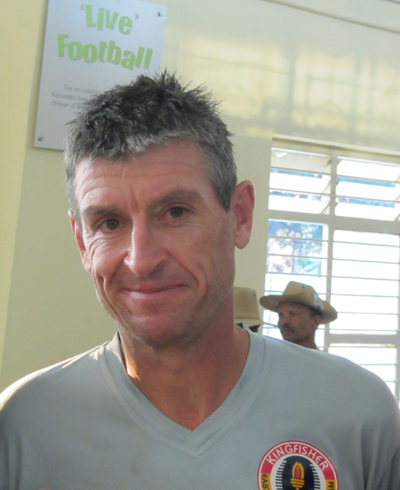
Trevor James Morgan in 2011

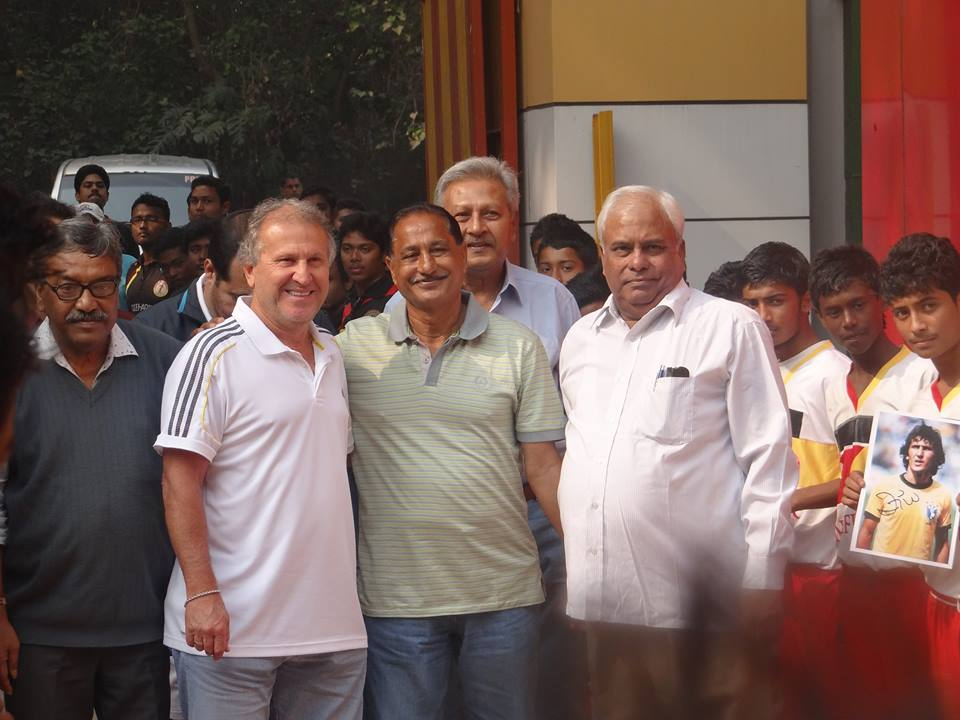
East Bengal coach Armando Colaco with Brazilian legend Zico at the club tent in 2014

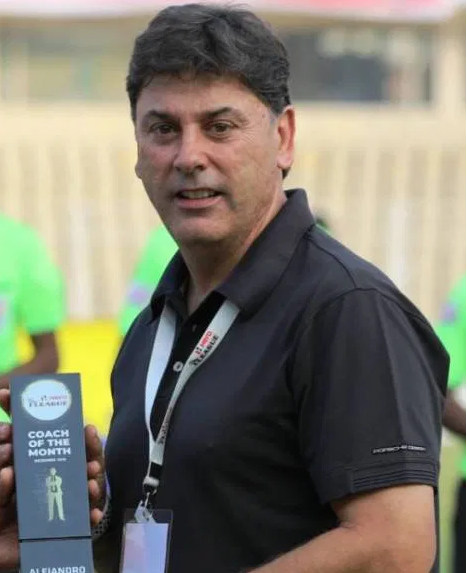
Alejandro Menéndez with I-League coach of the month award (December 2019) in January 2020.

From 1920 to 1960, team management and coaching was undertaken by the club's executive committee members and senior players. The subsequent coaching role was known originally as "secretary-coach", as the coach also managed the club's affairs off the pitch as well as on it. Former club secretary Late. J. C. Guha was one of the pioneers of this role as he took over the club in the early 40s and managed the club both on and off the field till he retired in the late 50s and eventually the role of a permanent first team "head coach" was defined and Sushil Bhattacharya was appointed as the first coach by the club in 1961.

=== 1960–1970: Early years ===
Sushil Bhattacharya was appointed by the club as the first-ever head coach of the senior men's football team in 1961. In his first and only season in charge, he helped the team win the Calcutta Football League title after a gap of 9 years, the IFA Shield title and also the Dr H. K. Mookherjee Shield. The following year, former club legends Poritosh Chakraborty and Promod Dasgupta took charge of the team jointly and led the team to a Rovers Cup title. In 1963, the East Bengal club appointed Amal Dutta as the head coach of the club for the first time and he served the club for two seasons, although without any major success. In 1966, Mohammed Hussein was appointed as the head coach of the team and he helped the team win back the Calcutta League title once again after 5 years. Hussein remained in charge for 3 seasons (1966–67, 1967–68 and 1970–71) and helped the club win 7 major titles including two Calcutta League titles, two Durand Cup titles, two IFA Shield titles and one Rovers Cup title.

=== 1970–1995: Dominance and road to professionalism ===
Swaraj Ghosh was appointed the coach of the club in 1971 and he led the club to another Calcutta League title. In 1972, the East Bengal club appointed former India national team captain P. K. Banerjee as the head coach of the club and the most dominating era of the club began. In 1972, his first season in charge, P. K. Banerjee led the East Bengal club to become champions in all five tournaments his team participated in, remaining unbeaten throughout the season and conceding just two goals in 42 matches. East Bengal club became the first-ever Indian club to win the coveted Triple-crown of Indian football: The IFA Shield, the Durand Cup and the Rovers Cup in the same season. The following season, the undefeated streak extended to 57 matches, before tasting defeat for the first time against Khidderpore in the Calcutta League. The club won five more titles in 1973 including two famous victories over North Korean football teams, first defeating Pyongyang City in the IFA Shield final and then defeating Dok Ro Gang in the DCM Trophy final, a team which consisted of players from the 1966 FIFA World Cup North Korean squad. In 1975, P. K. Banerjee led East Bengal to achieve history, as they first won the Calcutta Football League title for the sixth consecutive time winning all the matches, overtaking the record of five titles set my Mohammedan Sporting from 1934 to 1938, and then a fourth consecutive IFA Shield title defeating arch-rivals Mohun Bagan in the final by 5–0, the highest margin till date in a Kolkata Derby game. P. K. Banerjee led the East Bengal club to sixteen major trophies in four seasons which included four Calcutta League titles, four IFA Shield titles, three Rovers Cup titles, two DCM trophies, two Bordoloi Trophy wins and one Durand Cup title.

After P. K. Banerjee left after 1975, Amal Dutta was once again appointed as the head coach of the club for his second stint after 1964. Dutta led East Bengal to three titles in two seasons, including a famous all win Calcutta league title in 1977. Former India and club legend Arun Ghosh was appointed as the coach in 1978 and he led the club to their first-ever Federation Cup title in the club's very first appearance in the tournament, jointly shared with Mohun Bagan. After a disappointing 1979 season, Arun Ghosh was replaced by P. K. Banerjee once again for his second stint with the club and he led the team to their second Federation Cup triumph, again jointly shared with Mohun Bagan, the Darjeeling Gold Cup and a Rovers Cup title, jointly shared with Mohammedan Sporting. P. K. Banerjee had three more stints with the club, first in 1983–84, then again in 1985–86 where he led the club to their third Federation Cup title defeating Mohun Bagan 1–0 in the final and then again from 1988 to 1990 winning five more trophies for the club. In 1985, after winning the Federation Cup title, P. K. Banerjee led the East Bengal club to their first-ever international triumph as the club won the Coca-Cola Cup, the Central-Asia zonal tournament, held as a preliminary tournament for the 1985-86 Asian Club Championship. In total, P. K. Banerjee won thirty-one titles as the head coach of East Bengal, a record still unmatched to date.

In 1990, the club appointed another former India and club legend Syed Nayeemuddin as the head coach and in his first season, he led East Bengal club to their second Triple-crown of Indian football. Nayeemuddin led East Bengal to six trophies in two seasons in his first stint with the club. He was again appointed as the head coach in 1994 when he again led the team to seven trophies in two seasons. He had one more stint as the head coach in 2000 and holds the record of winning eighteen trophies as the head coach of the club, only second to P. K. Banerjee.

=== 1996–2020: National League and I-League era ===
The National Football League was launched in 1996, the first nationwide top division league in India and East Bengal club appointed club legend Monoranjan Bhattacharya as the head coach and P. K. Banerjee as the Technical Director of the team. P. K. Banerjee discontinued after a year, but Monoranjan Bhattacharya remained in charge for three seasons, winning seven trophies including a Federation Cup triumph against Dempo in 1996. Monoranjan Bhattacharya was once again brought back in 2000–01 after Syed Nayeemuddin left charge just before the National League and Bhattacharya led the club to their maiden National Football League triumph in 2000–01. Monoranjan Bhattacharya continued until the mid-way of the 2002–03 season, before resigning over poor results. He won a total of ten trophies as the head coach of East Bengal.

After Monoranjan Bhattacharya stepped down, another club legend Subhash Bhowmick was appointed as the head coach of the club. This was Bhowmick's second stint with the club after 1999–00. Bhowmick took charge of the team and won back to back National Football League titles in 2002–03 and 2003–04. In 2002–03 season, Bhowmick led East Bengal to all five trophies the club participated in, the feat East Bengal club achieved back in 1972–73. The following season, Bhowmick made history as he led the East Bengal club to the 2003 ASEAN Club Championship title in Jakarta, defeating BEC Tero Sasana in the final. Bhowmick won a total of twelve trophies as the head coach of the club, only third behind P. K. Banerjee and Syed Nayeemuddin.

In 2005, Bhowmick stepped down from his position due to legal issues, and the club appointed Philippe De Ridder, the first-ever foreign national to be the head coach of East Bengal. Ridder led East Bengal to the 2006 Super Cup title after finishing runners-up in the 2005–06 National Football League. Brazilian veteran coach Carlos Roberto Pereira was appointed in charge in 2006–07 season winning just the Calcutta Football League. Between 2007 and 2010, the club changed the head coach seven times with the likes of Subrata Bhattacharya, Monoranjan Bhattacharya, Aloke Mukherjee, Stanley Rozario, Subhash Bhowmick and Philippe De Ridder taking charge. Subrata Bhattacharya led East Bengal to their fifth Federation Cup triumph in 2007 after eleven years, while Ridder led the club to their sixth Federation Cup title in 2009–10.

In 2010, English coach Trevor James Morgan was appointed as the head coach of the club. Morgan led East Bengal to eight trophies in his three-season in charge, which included three Calcutta League titles, two Federation Cup titles (2010 and 2012), one IFA Shield, one Super Cup and one Platinum Jubilee Cup title. He was once again appointed as the coach in 2016, and in his two spells with the club, he was won a total of nine trophies, the most by any foreign coach for the club.

The club also appointed the likes of Marcos Falopa, Armando Colaco, Eelco Schattorie, Biswajit Bhattacharya, Khalid Jamil, Alejandro Menéndez and Mario Rivera Campesino after Morgan left in 2013.

=== 2020–present: Indian Super League era ===
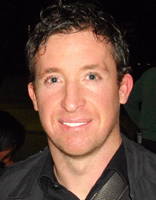
Robbie Fowler, head coach of East Bengal in its inaugural season in ISL.

In 2020, East Bengal club jumped from the I-League to the Indian Super League, and appointed Liverpool legend Robbie Fowler as the head coach of the club. Fowler took charge of the team in the 2020–21 season and finished ninth in the Indian Super League campaign. The club and Robbie Fowler mutually terminated the contract in 2021, and former Real Madrid Castilla coach Manolo Díaz was appointed in charge for the 2021–22 season. However, Diaz lasted just eight matches failing to win even one game and the club mutually terminated his contract on 28 December 2021 and assistant coach and former player Renedy Singh was appointed as the interim head coach of the team. On 1 January 2022, East Bengal announced that former Spanish head coach Mario Rivera Campesino, who was in-charge of the team in the 2019–20 season, has been re-appointed as the head coach of the team for the remaining of the season, thus becoming the third foreign national to be appointed as the head coach of East Bengal twice after Philippe de Ridder and Trevor James Morgan.

On 27 July 2022, East Bengal Club and Emami Group, the new investor group of the club, announced the appointment of former India national football team manager Stephen Constantine as the new head coach of the club for the 2022–23 season. However, after finishing ninth in the Indian Super League, the club management decided not to renew the contract and parted ways with Stephen after the season ended. Meanwhile, Indian pro license holder Bino George was appointed as the head coach of the East Bengal reserves and he took charge of the East Benal team in the Calcutta Football League. (Note: East Bengal Club Reserves head-coach Bino George took charge of the team for the Calcutta Football League for four seasons: 2022, 2023, 2024, 2025 and the first match of the 2026 as East Bengal mostly field their reserve squad, with the first team playing in the Indian Super League.) On 25 April 2023, East Bengal announced the appointment of former Indian Super League winning coach Carles Cuadrat as the new head coach for the season. In 2024, Carles Cuadrat led East Bengal to become the champions of the 2024 Indian Super Cup defeating Odisha in the final to break a twelve-year wait for a national cup trophy. However, after another ninth-place finish in the 2023–24 season in the Indian Super League and consecutive five defeats early in the 2024–25 season, Carles Cuadrat resigned as the head coach on 30 September 2024, with Bino George taking over as the interim head coach of the team. On 8 October 2024, East Bengal appointed Spanish head-coach Óscar Bruzón as the head coach of the team until the end of the season. Oscar Bruzon led East Bengal to a historic 2025–26 Indian Super League title, ending a twenty-two year wait for a national league title for East Bengal Club. However, soon after, Oscar Bruzon announced his departure from the club and East Bengal roped in three time Indian Super League champion – Antonio Lopez Habas as the head coach of the team.

== East Bengal coaches ==
Key

- † Coaches with this background and symbol in the "Name" column are italicised to denote caretaker appointments.
- ‡ Coaches with this background and symbol in the "Name" column are italicised to denote caretaker appointments promoted to full-time coach.

List of East Bengal coaches
Season	Nationality	Name	Honours	Ref
1920–61	—	None	—	
1961–62	India	Sushil Bhattacharya	CFL, IFA Shield, Dr. H. K. Mookherjee Shield	
1962–63	India	Poritosh Chakraborty and Promod Dasgupta	Rovers Cup	
1963–64	India	Sachindranath 'Langcha' Mitra	—	
1963–64	India	Amal Dutta	—	
1964–65	India	Amal Dutta	—	
1965–66	—	None	IFA Shield	
1966–67	India	Mohammed Hussein	CFL, IFA Shield	
1967–68	India	Mohammed Hussein	Durand Cup, Rovers Cup	
1968–69	—	None	Bordoloi Trophy, Sait Nagjee, Kerala FA Shield	
1969–70	—	None	Rovers Cup	
1970–71	India	Mohammed Hussein	CFL, IFA Shield, Durand Cup	
1971–72	India	Swaraj Ghosh	CFL	
1972–73	India	P. K. Banerjee	CFL, IFA Shield, Durand Cup, Rovers Cup, Bordoloi Trophy	
1973–74	India	P. K. Banerjee	CFL, IFA Shield, Rovers Cup, D.C.M. Trophy, Bordoloi Trophy	
1974–75	India	P. K. Banerjee	CFL, IFA Shield, D.C.M. Trophy	
1975–76	India	P. K. Banerjee	CFL, IFA Shield, Rovers Cup	
1976–77	India	Amal Dutta	IFA Shield, Darjeeling Gold Cup	
1977–78	India	Amal Dutta	CFL	
1978–79	India	Arun Ghosh	Federation Cup, Durand Cup, Bordoloi Trophy	
1979–80	India	Arun Ghosh	—	
1980–81	India	P. K. Banerjee	Federation Cup, Rovers Cup	
1981–82	India	Prabir Mazumdar	Stafford Cup	
1981–82	India	Santo Mitra	IFA Shield, Darjeeling Gold Cup	
1982–83	India	Amal Dutta	CFL, Durand Cup, Darjeeling Gold Cup	
1983–84	India	P. K. Banerjee	IFA Shield, D.C.M. Trophy	
1984–85	India	Amal Dutta	Sanjay Gandhi Gold Cup, IFA Shield	
1985–86	India	P. K. Banerjee	Federation Cup, CFL, Coca-Cola Cup, Darjeeling Gold Cup	
1985–86	India	Shyam Thapa ‡	Sait Nagjee	
1986–87	India	Shyam Thapa ‡	IFA Shield, Stafford Cup	
1987–88	India	Shyam Thapa ‡	CFL, All Airlines Gold Cup	
1988–89	India	P. K. Banerjee	CFL, All Airlines Gold Cup	
1989–90	India	P. K. Banerjee	CFL, Durand Cup, SSS Trophy	
1990–91	India	Shyam Thapa	All Airlines Gold Cup	
1990–91	India	Syed Nayeemuddin	IFA Shield, Durand Cup, Rovers Cup	
1991–92	India	Syed Nayeemuddin	CFL, IFA Shield, Durand Cup	
1991–92	India	Amal Dutta	All Airlines Gold Cup, SSS Trophy	
1992–93	India	Amal Dutta	ATPA Shield, Bordoloi Trophy	
1992–93	India	Shymal Ghosh	—	
1993–94	India	Shymal Ghosh	CFL, Durand Cup, Wai Wai Cup, Kalinga Cup	
1994–95	India	Shymal Ghosh	—	
1994–95	India	Syed Nayeemuddin	IFA Shield, Rovers Cup	
1995–96	India	Syed Nayeemuddin	Mcdowell's Cup, CFL, IFA Shield, Durand Cup, All Airlines Gold Cup	
1996–97	India	Monoranjan Bhattacharya	CFL, Federation Cup	
1997–98	India	Monoranjan Bhattacharya	Super Cup, IFA Shield, McDowells Cup	
1998–99	India	Monoranjan Bhattacharya	CFL, All Airlines Gold Cup	
1999–00	India	Subhas Bhowmick	CFL	
2000–01	India	Syed Nayeemuddin	CFL, IFA Shield, Mcdowell's Cup	
2000–01	India	Monoranjan Bhattacharya	National Football League	
2001–02	India	Monoranjan Bhattacharya	IFA Shield, All Airlines Gold Cup	
2001–02	India	Subhash Bhowmick	—	
2002–03	India	Subhash Bhowmick	National Football League, CFL, IFA Shield, Durand Cup, Independence Cup	
2003–04	India	Subhash Bhowmick	ASEAN Club Championship, National Football League, CFL	
2004–05	India	Subhash Bhowmick	CFL, Durand Cup, San Miguel International Cup	
2005–06	India	Subhash Bhowmick	—	
2005–06	India	Bikash Panji †	—	
2005–06	Belgium	Philippe De Ridder	Super Cup	
2006–07	Brazil	Carlos Roberto Pereira	CFL	
2007–08	India	Subrata Bhattacharya	Federation Cup	
2007–08	India	Monoranjan Bhattacharya	—	
2007–08	India	Aloke Mukherjee †	—	
2008–09	India	Monoranjan Bhattacharya	—	
2008–09	India	Stanley Rozario	—	
2008–09	India	Subhash Bhowmick	—	
2009–10	India	Subhash Bhowmick	—	
2009–10	India	Tushar Rakshit †	—	
2009–10	Belgium	Philippe De Ridder	Federation Cup	
2010–11	England	Trevor Morgan	Federation Cup, CFL, Platinum Jubilee Cup	
2011–12	England	Trevor Morgan	Super Cup, CFL	
2012–13	England	Trevor Morgan	Federation Cup, CFL, IFA Shield	
2013–14	Brazil	Marcos Falopa	—	
2013–14	India	Armando Colaco	CFL	
2014–15	India	Armando Colaco	CFL	
2014–15	Netherlands	Eelco Schattorie	—	
2015–16	India	Biswajit Bhattacharya	CFL	
2015–16	England	Trevor Morgan	—	
2016–17	England	Trevor Morgan	CFL	
2016–17	India	Ranjan Chowdhury Sr. †	—	(Note: Academy Head Coach Ranjan Chowdhury was announced as the head-coach cum manager for the Bordoloi Trophy as Trevor Morgan left for holidays after the CFL.)
2016–17	India	Mridul Banerjee †	—	
2016–17	India	Ranjan Chowdhury †	—	
2017–18	India	Khalid Jamil	CFL	
2018–19	India	Bastob Roy	—	
2018–19	Spain	Alejandro Menéndez	—	
2019–20	Spain	Alejandro Menéndez	—	
2019–20	India	Bastob Roy †	—	
2019–20	Spain	Mario Rivera Campesino	—	
2020–21	India	Francisco Bruto Da Costa	—	
2020–21	England	Robbie Fowler	—	
2021–22	Spain	Manolo Díaz	—	
2021–22	India	Renedy Singh †	—	
2021–22	Spain	Mario Rivera Campesino	—	
2022–23	England	Stephen Constantine	—	
2022–23	India	Bino George †	—	
2023–24	India	Bino George †	—	
2023–24	Spain	Carles Cuadrat	Super Cup	
2024–25	Spain	Carles Cuadrat	—	
2024–25	India	Bino George †	CFL	
2024–25	Spain	Óscar Bruzón	—	
2025–26	Spain	Óscar Bruzón	Indian Super League	
2025–26	India	Archisman Biswas †		(Note: Archisman Biswas took charge of the team in the Oil India Challenge Gold Cup where East Bengal mostly fielded their reserve squad.)
2025–26	India	Bino George †	CFL	
2026–27	India	Archisman Biswas †		(Note: East Bengal Club Reserves head-coach Bino George remained busy with the senior squad, hence assistant coach Archisman Biswas took charge for the 2026 CFL Premier Division as the head coach for all the matches except for the first match, as East Bengal mostly field their reserve squad, with the first team playing in the Indian Super League.)
2026–27	Spain	Antonio Lopez Habas	Durand Cup	

== Statistics ==
East Bengal club in its history of more than a hundred years has had a number of coaches who won quite a few honours for the club. The legendary Pradip Kumar Banerjee in his nine-season spell with the club has won a total of thirty-one trophies, including five trophies in a season twice in 1972–73 and 1973–74, which is the highest for any coach in the club's history. The Dronacharya award winner Syed Nayeemuddin comes second in the most honours list with a total of sixteen titles to his name as the coach of Red and Gold brigade including another "Triple Crown" in 1990–91. Former player and coach Subhash Bhowmick too brought in huge success in the current millennia with twelve titles on his regime including five trophies in a season again in 2002–03, winning back to back National League titles and the famous 2003 ASEAN Club Championship in Jakarta. Amal Dutta, regarded as the very first professional coach in Indian football too won eleven titles during his five different spells at the club. Club legend Monoranjan Bhattacharyais fifth on the list with ten trophies as the head coach, including the very first National League title in 2000–01. Among foreign coaches, Englishman Trevor James Morgan has won the most titles for the club, with nine titles to his name in two spells at the club.

=== Record for East Bengal coaches ===
Record in competitive matches for East Bengal coaches since the beginning of National Football League in India from the 1996–1997 season.

Note: Penalty shoot-out wins or losses are counted as draws, as per the official standard.

As of 20 November 2026

Record in Competitive matches for East Bengal coaches
Name	Nat.	From	To	P	W	D	L	GF	GA	GD	Win%
Monoranjan Bhattacharya	India	1 April 1996	31 March 1999	176	111	36	29	289	117	+172	63.07
Subhash Bhowmick	India	20 May 1999	31 March 2000	51	28	12	11	71	31	+40	54.90
Syed Nayeemuddin	India	4 April 2000	13 January 2001	32	25	2	5	56	16	+40	78.13
Monoranjan Bhattacharya	India	13 January 2001	24 January 2002	52	31	13	8	84	29	+55	59.62
Subhash Bhowmick	India	25 January 2002	2 December 2005	200	133	29	38	384	144	+240	66.50
Bikash Panji (Note: Caretaker manager after Subhash Bhowmick was sacked for legal reasons.)	India	4 December 2005	15 December 2005	2	1	0	1	3	2	+1	50.00
Philippe De Ridder	Belgium	15 December 2005	31 May 2006	18	10	4	4	27	17	+10	55.56
Carlos Roberto Pereira	Brazil	4 July 2006	22 May 2007	38	18	9	11	53	43	+10	47.37
Subrata Bhattacharya	India	23 May 2007	16 January 2008	30	15	4	11	52	40	+12	50.00
Monoranjan Bhattacharya	India	16 January 2008	19 February 2008	7	3	2	2	6	5	+1	42.86
Aloke Mukherjee	India	20 February 2008	31 May 2008	9	2	2	5	6	10	−4	22.22
Monoranjan Bhattacharya	India	1 July 2008	15 September 2008	14	7	4	3	21	12	+9	50.00
Stanley Rozario	India	16 September 2008	24 December 2008	15	6	4	5	16	12	+4	40.00
Subhash Bhowmick	India	24 December 2008	25 October 2009	20	5	6	9	32	33	−1	25.00
Tushar Rakshit (Note: Caretaker manager after Subhash Bhowmick resigned. Includes record for the matches against Salgaocar on 29.10.2009, Chirag Kerala on 2.11.2009, Air India on 7.11.2009 and Shillong Lajong on 12.11.2009, as Tushar was in-charge as the head-coach before Philippe De Ridder took over.)	India	25 October 2009	12 November 2009	4	3	1	0	6	1	+5	75.00
Philippe De Ridder	Belgium	6 November 2009	31 May 2010	46	16	17	13	56	52	+4	34.78
Trevor James Morgan	England	16 July 2010	24 May 2013	178	112	31	35	351	160	+191	62.92
Marcos Falopa	Brazil	12 June 2013	14 November 2013	11	5	2	4	20	17	+3	45.45
Armando Colaco	India	14 November 2013	19 February 2015	54	30	15	9	99	47	+52	55.56
Eelco Schattorie	Netherlands	20 February 2015	31 May 2015	20	8	4	8	31	31	+0	40.00
Biswajit Bhattacharya	India	19 June 2015	11 April 2016	29	19	5	5	60	31	+29	65.52
Trevor James Morgan	England	13 April 2016	17 April 2017	28	18	4	6	48	24	+24	64.29
Ranjan Chowdhury Sr.	India	19 September 2016	30 September 2016	5	4	0	1	13	2	+11	80.00
Mridul Banerjee	India	18 April 2017	19 April 2017	0	0	0	0	0	0	+0	—
Ranjan Chowdhury (Note: Caretaker manager under Technical-Director Monoranjan Bhattacharya.)	India	20 April 2017	31 May 2017	6	3	2	1	10	4	+6	50.00
Khalid Jamil	India	21 July 2017	26 April 2018	31	18	9	4	65	31	+34	58.06
Bastob Roy (Note: Head-coach under Technical-Director Subhash Bhowmick.)	India	18 May 2018	19 August 2018	11	7	2	2	19	7	+12	63.64
Alejandro Menéndez (Note: Include two walkovers East Bengal awarded: 1. vs Delhi Dynamos in 2019 Indian Super Cup; 2. vs Calcutta Customs in 2019 CFL Premier Division.)	Spain	19 August 2018	21 January 2020	43	24	7	12	75	38	+37	55.81
Bastob Roy (Note: Interim head-coach after Alejandro Menéndez left and before Mario Rivera Campesino took charge. Includes record for the match against Chennai City on 25.01.2020.)	India	21 January 2020	26 January 2020	1	1	0	0	2	0	+2	100.00
Mario Rivera Campesino	Spain	23 January 2020	31 May 2020	8	3	3	2	11	8	+3	37.50
Francisco Bruto Da Costa (Note: Francisco Bruto Da Costa was appointed as the head coach however, his contract was mutually terminated before the Indian Super League campaign started.)	India	30 July 2020	9 October 2020	0	0	0	0	0	0	+0	—
Robbie Fowler	England	9 October 2020	8 September 2021	20	3	8	9	22	33	−11	15.00
Manolo Díaz	Spain	8 September 2021	28 December 2021	8	0	4	4	10	18	−8	0.00
Renedy Singh (Note: Interim head coach after Manolo Díaz left charge. Includes record for the matches against Bengaluru on 4.01.2022, Mumbai City on 7.01.2022 and Jamshedpur on 11.01.2022, as Renedy was in-charge as the head-coach before Mario Rivera Campesino took over.)	India	28 December 2021	14 January 2022	3	0	2	1	1	2	−1	0.00
Mario Rivera Campesino	Spain	1 January 2022	31 May 2022	9	1	2	6	7	16	−9	11.11
Bino George (Note: Include five walkovers East Bengal received. Two in the 2023 CFL Premier Division: 1. vs Bhawanipore; 2. vs Mohun Bagan SG; Two in the 2024 CFL Premier Division: 3. vs Bhawanipore; 4. vs Diamond Harbour; One in the 2025 CFL Premier Division: 5. vs Army Red.) (Note: Interim head coach after Carles Cuadrat left charge. Includes record for the match against Jamshedpur on 5.10.2024, as Bino was in-charge as the head-coach before Óscar Bruzón took over.) (Note: Includes record for the 2025 Sikkim Gold Cup where East Bengal mostly fielded their reserve squad and Bino George took charge of the team.) (Note: Includes record for the 2026 IFA Shield group stage fixture against Calcutta Customs where East Bengal mostly fielded their reserve squad and Bino George took charge of the team.)	India	26 July 2022	present	57	41	10	6	151	36	+115	71.93
Stephen Constantine	England	27 July 2022	25 April 2023	27	7	6	14	32	48	−16	25.93
Carles Cuadrat	Spain	25 April 2023	30 September 2024	40	16	8	16	60	54	+6	40.00
Óscar Bruzón	Spain	8 October 2024	31 May 2026	52	25	14	13	95	53	+42	48.08
Archisman Biswas (Note: Archisman Biswas coached East Bengal as they fielded the reserves team for the 2026 Sikkim Gold Cup.)	India	25 October 2025	present	15	8	5	2	34	12	+22	53.33
Antonio Lopez Habas	Spain	6 July 2026	present	18	8	4	6	47	22	+25	44.44

=== Most successful East Bengal coaches ===
Below is the list of the 5 most successful East Bengal head-coaches as per most honours won:

No	Name	I-League/NFL	Fed Cup	Calcutta League	IFA Shield	Durand Cup	Rovers Cup	Others	Total
1	(India) Pradip Kumar Banerjee	—	2	7	5	2	4	9 (Note: Coca-Cola Cup, DCM Trophy (3), All Airlines Gold Cup, Bordoloi Trophy (2), SSS Trophy, Darjeeling Gold Cup.)	29
2	(India) Syed Nayeemuddin	0	0	3	5	3	2	3 (Note: McDowell's Cup (2), All Airlines Gold Cup.)	16
3	(India) Subhash Bhowmick	2	0	4	1	2	0	3 (Note: Independence Cup, ASEAN Club Championship, San Miguel International Cup.)	12
3	(India) Amal Dutta	—	0	2	2	1	0	7 (Note: Darjeeling Gold Cup (2), Sanjay Gandhi Gold Cup, All Airlines Gold Cup, SSS Trophy, ATPA Shield, Bordoloi Trophy.)	12
5	(India) Monoranjan Bhattacharya	1	1	2	2	0	0	4 (Note: Indian Super Cup, McDowell's Cup, All Airlines Gold Cup (2).)	10

=== Most trophies won in a single stint ===
No	Seasons	Name	I-League/NFL	Federation Cup	Calcutta League	IFA Shield	Durand Cup	Rovers Cup	Others (Note: Includes ASEAN Club Championship, D.C.M. Trophy, All Airlines Gold Cup, Bordoloi Trophy, Wai Wai Cup, Super Cup, San Miguel International Cup, McDowell's Cup, Independence Cup, Platinum Jubilee Cup, SSS Trophy.)	Total
1	1972–73 to 1975–76	(India) Pradip Kumar Banerjee	–	–	4	4	1	3	4	16
2	2001–02 to 2005–06	(India) Subhash Bhowmick	2	0	3	1	2	0	3	11
3	2010–11 to 2012–13	(England) Trevor James Morgan	0	2	3	1	0	—	2	8
4	1994–95 to 1995–96	(India) Syed Nayeemuddin	—	0	1	2	1	1	2	7
4	1996–97 to 1998–99	(India) Monoranjan Bhattacharya	0	1	2	1	0	0	3	7
5	1990–91 to 1991–92	(India) Syed Nayeemuddin	—	0	1	2	2	1	0	6

== List of technical directors for East Bengal ==
East Bengal Club has appointed a technical director at times to over-head the head-coaches. The very first Technical Director was the legendary Pradip Kumar Banerjee who was appointed in 1996–97 season over head-coach Monoranjan Bhattacharya. Later Monoranjan Bhattacharya himself, and Subhash Bhowmick too were appointed as the Technical Directors of the team in separate occasions. In 2025, East Bengal appointed former Hyderabad and Shillong Lajong manager Thangboi Singto as the Head of Football at the club.

List of East Bengal Club Technical Directors and Head of Football
Season	Name	Ref
1996–97	(India) Pradip Kumar Banerjee	
2016–17	(India) Monoranjan Bhattacharya	
2017–18	(India) Subhash Bhowmick	
2025–26	(India) Thangboi Singto	

== Foreign coaches for East Bengal ==
East Bengal appointed their very first foreign coach in 2005 when they signed Belgian head coach Philippe De Ridder. The club has since appointed eleven foreign coaches, the latest being Spaniard Carles Cuadrat in 2023. English coach Trevor James Morgan is the most successful foreign coach at the club with 130 wins from 206 matches, amassing a 63.1% win-ratio in all competitions during his four-year stay in two spells at the club. Philippe De Ridder, Trevor James Morgan, and Mario Rivera Campesino are the only three foreign coaches to be appointed more than once by the club.

=== Record for foreign coaches ===
Record in competitive matches for foreign coaches.

Note: Penalty shoot-out wins or losses are counted as draws, as per the official standard.

As of 20 November 2026

Record for foreign coaches at East Bengal
Name	Nat.	From	To	P	W	D	L	GF	GA	GD	Win %
Philippe De Ridder (Note: Philippe De Ridder was appointed on 6 November 2009, however, he took charge of the team from 18 November, from the match against Railway FC in the 2009–10 season.)	Belgium	15 December 2005	31 May 2006	18	10	4	4	27	17	+10	55.56
Philippe De Ridder	Belgium	6 November 2009	31 May 2010	46	16	17	13	60	52	+8	34.78
Philippe De Ridder	Belgium	Total		64	26	21	17	87	69	+18	40.63
Carlos Roberto Pereira	Brazil	4 July 2006	31 May 2007	38	18	9	11	53	43	+10	47.37
Trevor James Morgan	England	16 July 2010	24 May 2013	178	112	31	35	351	160	+191	62.92
Trevor James Morgan	England	13 April 2016	17 April 2017	28	18	4	6	48	24	+24	64.29
Trevor James Morgan	England	Total		206	130	35	41	399	184	+215	63.11
Marcos Falopa	Brazil	12 June 2013	14 November 2013	11	5	2	4	20	17	+3	45.45
Eelco Schattorie	Netherlands	20 February 2015	31 May 2015	20	8	4	8	31	31	+0	40.00
Alejandro Menéndez (Note: Includes two walkovers East Bengal awarded; 1. vs Delhi Dynamos in 2019 Indian Super Cup; 2. vs Calcutta Customs in 2019 Calcutta Premier Division.)	Spain	19 August 2018	21 January 2020	43	24	7	12	75	38	+37	55.81
Mario Rivera Campesino (Note: Mario Rivera was appointed on 23 January 2020, however, he took charge of the team from 26 January, from the match against Indian Arrows in the 2019–20 season.)	Spain	23 January 2020	31 May 2020	8	3	3	2	11	8	+3	37.50
Mario Rivera Campesino	Spain	1 January 2022	31 May 2022	9	1	2	6	7	16	−9	11.11
Mario Rivera Campesino	Spain	Total		17	4	5	8	18	24	−6	23.53
Robbie Fowler	England	9 October 2020	8 September 2021	20	3	8	9	22	33	−11	15.00
Manolo Díaz	Spain	8 September 2021	28 December 2021	8	0	4	4	10	18	−8	0.00
Stephen Constantine	England	27 July 2022	25 April 2023	27	7	6	14	32	48	−16	25.93
Carles Cuadrat	Spain	25 April 2023	30 September 2024	40	16	8	16	60	54	+6	40.00
Óscar Bruzón	Spain	8 October 2024	31 May 2026	52	25	14	13	95	53	+42	48.08
Antonio Lopez Habas	Spain	6 July 2026	present	18	8	4	6	47	22	+25	44.44

=== Foreign support staff for East Bengal ===
In 2003–04 season, East Bengal brought in South African Kevin Jackson as the physical trainer for the team ahead of participating in the 2003 ASEAN Club Championship. He was the first foreign physical trainer that the club has ever hired. The club had appointed many foreign physical trainers since then. In 2015–16, East Bengal appointed their former defender Kenyan Sammy Omollo as the assistant coach of the team, the first foreign personnel to take charge of that role.

Season	Nat.	Name	Designation	Ref.
2003–04	South Africa	Kevin Jackson	Physical Trainer	
2004–05	England	Peter McKnight	Physical Trainer	
2005–06	England	Peter McKnight	Physical Trainer	
2008–09	Belgium	Neuzy Jean-Marie	Physical Trainer	
2009–10	Malaysia	Mashidi Suleiman	Physical Trainer	
2009–10	Australia	Monica Ahluwalia	Physical Trainer	
2013–14	Brazil	Americo Falopa	Physical Trainer (Note: Also served as the Goalkeeping coach.)	
2015–16	Kenya	Sammy Omollo	Assistant coach	
2016–17	England	Warren Hackett	Assistant coach	
2016–17	England	Simon Maltby	Physical trainer	
2017–18	Brazil	Djair Miranda Garcia	Physical trainer	
2018–19	Spain	Mario Rivera Campesino	Assistant coach (Note: Also served as the video analyst.)	
2018–19	Spain	Carlos Nodar Paz	Physical trainer	
2019–20	Spain	Carlos Nodar Paz	Physical trainer	
2019–20	Spain	Josep Ferré	Assistant coach	
2019–20	Spain	Marçal Trulls Sevillano	Assistant coach	
2020–21	England	Tony Grant	Assistant coach	
2020–21	England	Terry McPhillips	Set-piece coach	
2020–21	England	Bobby Mimms	Goalkeeper coach	
2020–21	England	Michael Harding	Physical trainer	
2020–21	England	Jack Inman	Head of sport science	
2021–22	Spain	Angel Puebla Garcia	Assistant coach (Note: Also fulfilled the responsibilities of a strength and fitness coach.)	
2021–22	Malaysia	Joseph Ronald D’Angelus	Head of sport science	
2021–22	England	Leslie Cleevely	Goalkeeper coach	
2021–22	Spain	Victor Herrero Forcada	Assistant coach	
2022–23	Iceland	Thórhallur Siggeirsson	Assistant coach	
2022–23	Australia	Andy Petterson	Goalkeeper coach	
2022–23	Australia	Owain Manship	Head of sport science	
2022–23	England	Sam Baker	Video analyst	
2023–24	Spain	Dimas Delgado	Assistant coach	
2023–24	Spain	Javier Pinillos	Goalkeepert coach	
2023–24	Spain	Senen Alvarez	Physiotherapist	
2023–24	Spain	Albert Martinez Bernat	Sports Scientist	
2024–25	Spain	Javier Sánchez	S&C Fitness coach	
2025–26	Spain	Javier Sánchez	S&C Fitness coach	
2025–26	Spain	Adrian Rubio Martinez	Assistant coach	
2026–27	Spain	Carlos Fonseca	Assistant coach	
2026–27	Spain	Alejandro Sanchez-Buitrago	S&C Fitness coach	

== Accolades ==
=== I-League Coach of the Month ===
In the 2019–20 I-League season, the AIFF had introduced the I-League Coach of the Month award, given to the best Coach of an I-League side for the month. The first award was awarded to East Bengal coach Alejandro Menendez for the month of December – 2019, as he managed to stay undefeated for the month with 2 wins and 2 draws.

I-League Coach of the Month
Season	Month	Nationality	Name	Ref
2019–20	December	Spain	Alejandro Menendez	
