= 1985 Indian Federation Cup final =

- Event: 1985 Indian Federation Cup
| East Bengal | Mohun Bagan |
| 1 | 0 |
- After extra time
- Date: 19 May 1985
- Venue: Sampangi Stadium, Bangalore, Karnataka

The 1985 Indian Federation Cup final was the 9th final of the Indian Federation Cup, the top knock-out competition in India, and was contested between Kolkata giants East Bengal and Mohun Bagan on 19 May 1985 at the Sampangi Stadium in Bangalore, Karnataka.

East Bengal won the final 1–0 courtesy of a goal by Jamshid Nassiri in the extra-time to claim their third Federation Cup title.

== Route to the final ==
| East Bengal | | | | Round | Mohun Bagan | | | |
|---|---|---|---|---|---|---|---|---|
| Opponent | Result | | | Group stage | Opponent | Result | | |
| HAL | 2–0 | | | Matchday 1 | Sesa Goa | 3–0 | | |
| Central Excise Cochin | 1–0 | | | Matchday 2 | Madura Coats | 3–0 | | |
| JCT | 2–0 | | | Matchday 3 | Integral Coach Factory | 4–0 | | |
| Opponent | Agg. | 1st leg | 2nd leg | Knockout Stage | Opponent | Agg. | 1st leg | 2nd leg |
| Punjab SEB | 2–1 | 2–0 | 0–1 | Semi–Final | Salgaocar | 1–1 (4–3 p) | 0–0 | 1–1 |

== Match ==
=== Summary ===
The Federation Cup final began at the Sampangi Stadium in Bangalore on 19 May 1985 in front of a packed crowd as two Kolkata giants East Bengal and Mohun Bagan faced each other in the Kolkata Derby. The match was also a classic rivalry between the two coaches P. K. Banerjee of East Bengal and Amal Dutta of Mohun Bagan, two of the most famous coaches from Bengal at the time. East Bengal started as the favorites with a strong defense consisting of Balai Mukherjee, Monoranjan Bhattacharya, Tarun Dey and Aloke Mukherjee and a star-studded forward line consisting of Krishanu Dey, Biswajit Bhattacharya, Bikash Panji and Jamshid Nassiri. Both teams however canceled each other in the regulation ninety minutes but East Bengal won the match in extra-time after Iranian forward Jamshid Nassiri scored with a 30-yard long-range effort as East Bengal defeated their arch-rival Mohun Bagan 1–0 and lifted their third Federation Cup title.

=== Details ===
19 May 1985
14:30 IST

| East Bengal | 1–0 (a.e.t.) | Mohun Bagan |
|---|---|---|
| Nassiri 102' |

Sampangi Stadium, Bangalore
Attendance: 20,000 (est.)

| East Bengal | Mohun Bagan |

| GK | (India) Bhaskar Ganguly |
| RB | (India) Balai Mukherjee (c) |
| CB | (India) Monoranjan Bhattacharya |
| CB | (India) Tarun Dey |
| LB | (India) Aloke Mukherjee |
| RM | (India) Bikash Panji |
| CM | (India) Sudip Chatterjee | (substituted off) 71' |
| LM | (India) Sunirmal Chakraborty |
| FW | (India) Biswajit Bhattacharya |
| FW | (India) Debasish Roy | (substituted off) 101' |
| FW | (Iran) Jamshid Nassiri |
Substitutes:
| CM | (India) Debasish Mishra | (substituted in) 71' |
| FW | (India) Krishanu Dey | (substituted in) 101' |
Head Coach:
(India) P. K. Banerjee

| GK | (India) Jagadish |
| RB | (India) Krishnendu Roy |
| CB | (India) Satyajit Ghosh |
| CB | (India) Subrata Bhattacharya (c) |
| LB | (India) Samar Bhattacharya |
| RM | (India) Abdul Majeed Kakroo |
| CM | (India) Prasanta Banerjee |
| LM | (India) Subir Sarkar | (substituted off) 61' |
| FW | (India) Babu Mani |
| FW | (India) Krishna Gopal Chowdhury |
| FW | (India) Bidesh Bose | (substituted off) 97' |
Substitutes:
| LM | (India) Mihir Bose | (substituted in) 81' |
| FW | (India) Karthik Sett | (substituted in) 97' |
Head coach:
(India) Amal Dutta

Match rules

- 90 minutes.
- 30 minutes of extra time if necessary.
- Penalty shoot-out if scores still level.

== See also ==
- India - List of Federation Cup Winners
