= Monoranjan Bhattacharya =

Indian footballer and coach

Personal information
- Full name: Monoranjan Bhattacharya
- Place of birth: Calcutta, West Bengal, India
- Position: Defender

Senior career*
Years	Team	Apps	(Gls)
- George Telegraph
1977–1986	East Bengal Club	?	(9)
1986	Abahani Krira Chakra	1	(0)
1986–1991	East Bengal Club	?	(6)
1991–1992	Mohun Bagan	?	(?)
1993	East Bengal Club	?	(?)

International career^{‡}
1978–1989	India	?	(?)

Managerial career
- 1996–1998: East Bengal Club
- 2000–2001: East Bengal Club
- 2008: East Bengal Club
- 2008–2009: Hindustan
- 2018: Tollygunge Agragami
- * Club domestic league appearances and goals as of 28 April 2008 ‡ National team caps and goals as of 28 April 2008

Monoranjan Bhattacharya (Bengali: মনোরঞ্জন ভট্টাচার্য), nicknamed Mona, is a retired Indian professional footballer and football manager. During his playing career, he represented the "Big Two" of Kolkata football, East Bengal and Mohun Bagan. He also represented India in various international tournaments between 1978 and 1989.

He was one of the finest Indian stopper-back during his time in Indian football. Foreigners who played against him have said he was physically strong, was good in aerial tussles and a very clean tackler. East Bengal supporters worship him. Legendary football coaches Amal Dutta, Pradip Kumar Banerjee and especially Arun Ghosh were influential in nurturing his talent.

== Club career ==
Bhattacharya appeared with Calcutta Football League club George Telegraph, before joining East Bengal Club in 1977. With the "red and gold brigade", he created a club record for continuously representing the club in a period spanning fourteen years. He was one of the most successful defenders of his time and was known for his strong and skillful game. He captained the club in 1981–82 season. In 1985, he won Federation Cup with the club and went on to represent his team at the 1985–86 Asian Club Championship in Saudi Arabia. Managed by legendary P. K. Banerjee, his team played in the Central Asia Zone (tournament named "Coca-Cola Cup"), where they defeated numerous foreign clubs to win it. They defeated New Road Team of Nepal 7–0, Abahani Krira Chakra of Bangladesh 1–0, thrashed Club Valencia of the Maldives 9–0 (the biggest margin of victory by an Indian team over any foreign opponents).

In the 1980s, Bhattacharya as stopper-back and Bhaskar Ganguly as goalkeeper, made East Bengal defense unbreakable. In 1986, he along with Bhaskar Ganguly signed with Bangladeshi club Abahani Krira Chakra for a crucial Dhaka Derby match to decide the Dhaka First Division League champions, and became one of the few Indian players who plied their trades abroad. However, after suffering a 2–0 defeat, both players returned to East Bengal. At the end of 1990–91 season, he left East Bengal to join their arch-rival Mohun Bagan AC. After spending a couple of seasons with Mohun Bagan, Monoranjan returned to East Bengal in 1993 for his last season as a player.

== International career ==
Monoranjan was a regular for India national football team between 1978 and 1989 and competed football tournaments within the period. He is praised for his performance against Argentina in 1984 Nehru Cup, where India was narrowly defeated by 1–0 with the goal from Ricardo Gareca.....

== Coaching career ==
Monoranjan is a qualified AFC coach who managed East Bengal Club from 1996 to 1998 and again in the season of 2000–01. Under his coaching, the club won its first National Football League title in 2000–01. In that season, they won Federation Cup. Due to East Bengal FC's poor showing in the inaugural 2007–08 I-League, their coach Subrata Bhattacharya resigned and Monoranjan became the coach of East Bengal for the third time. He guided the club hanging in the relegation zone to a sixth-place finish in the I-League. After the league ended, he decided not continue in the post citing prior family engagements.

In 2008, he was appointed head coach of DSA Senior Division side Hindustan FC for a season.

In 2018, Bhattacharya was appointed head coach of CFL Premier Division side Tollygunge Agragami.

== Career statistics ==
=== Managerial ===
As of 13 September 2022

Team		From	To	Record							
Team		From	To	G	W	D	L	GF	GA	GD	Win %
(India)	East Bengal	1 April 1996	31 March 1999	176	111	36	29	289	117	+172	63.07
(India)	East Bengal	13 January 2001	24 January 2002	52	31	13	8	84	29	+55	59.62
(India)	East Bengal	16 January 2008	19 February 2008	7	3	2	2	6	5	+1	42.86
(India)	East Bengal	1 July 2008	15 September 2008	14	7	4	3	21	12	+9	50.00
(India)	East Bengal	Total		249	152	55	42	400	163	+237	61.04

== Honours ==
=== Player ===
East Bengal

- Federation Cup: 1978–79, 1980–81, 1985
- IFA Shield: 1984, 1986, 1990, 1991
- Durand Cup: 1989, 1990, 1991, 1993
- Calcutta Football League: 1985, 1987, 1988, 1989, 1991, 1993
- Rovers Cup: 1990
- Wai Wai Cup (Nepal): 1993
- All Airlines Gold Cup: 1987, 1988, 1990
- Darjeeling Gold Cup: 1985
- SSS Trophy: 1989, 1991
- Sait Nagjee Trophy: 1986
- Stafford Cup: 1986

India

- South Asian Games Gold medal: 1985, 1987

Individual

- East Bengal "Lifetime Achievement Award": 2019

=== Manager ===
East Bengal

- Federation Cup: 1996
- National Football League: 2000–01

== See also ==
- List of Indian expatriate footballers
- List of East Bengal Club captains
- List of East Bengal Club coaches
- List of India national football team captains

== Bibliography ==
- Kapadia, Novy (2017). Barefoot to Boots: The Many Lives of Indian Football. Penguin Random House. ISBN 978-0-143-42641-7.
- Dineo, Paul; Mills, James (2001). Soccer in South Asia: Empire, Nation, Diaspora. London, United Kingdom: Frank Cass Publishers. p. 33. ISBN 978-0-7146-8170-2. Archived from the original on 25 July 2022.
- Majumdar, Boria; Bandyopadhyay, Kausik (2006). Goalless: The Story of a Unique Footballing Nation. Penguin India. ISBN 9780670058747.
- Martinez, Dolores; Mukharjiim, Projit B (2009). Football: From England to the World: The Many Lives of Indian Football. Routledge. ISBN 978-1-138-88353-6. Archived from the original on 2 July 2022.
- Nath, Nirmal (2011). History of Indian Football: Upto 2009–10. Readers Service. ISBN 9788187891963. Archived from the original on 22 July 2022.
- "Triumphs and Disasters: The Story of Indian Football, 1889—2000" (PDF). Archived from the original (PDF) on 13 August 2012.
- Roy, Gautam (1 January 2021). East Bengal 100. Allsport Foundation. ISBN 978-8194763109.
- Majumdar, Boria; Bandyopadhyay, Kausik (2006). A Social History Of Indian Football: Striving To Score. Routledge. ISBN 9780415348355. Archived from the original on 29 June 2021.
- Basu, Jaydeep (2003). Stories from Indian Football. UBS Publishers' Distributors. ISBN 9788174764546. Archived from the original on 11 October 2022.
- Tariq, T Islam (2025). মোহামেডান-আবাহনী ময়দানি লড়াই (transl. Mohammedan-Abahani battle field) (in Bengali). Annesha Prokashon. ISBN 978-984-99475-1-6.
- Chattopadhyay, Hariprasad (2017). Mohun Bagan–East Bengal (in Bengali). Kolkata: Parul Prakashan.
- Bhowmick, Mithun (15 December 2018). "ভারতীয় ফুটবলের অসুখসমূহ: পর্ব – ২" [Diseases of Indian football: Episode – 2]. bengali.indianexpress.com (in Bengali). Kolkata: IE Bangla Sports Desk. Indian Express News Service. Archived from the original on 15 November 2023.
