= Syed Nayeemuddin =

Indian footballer and coach (born 1944)

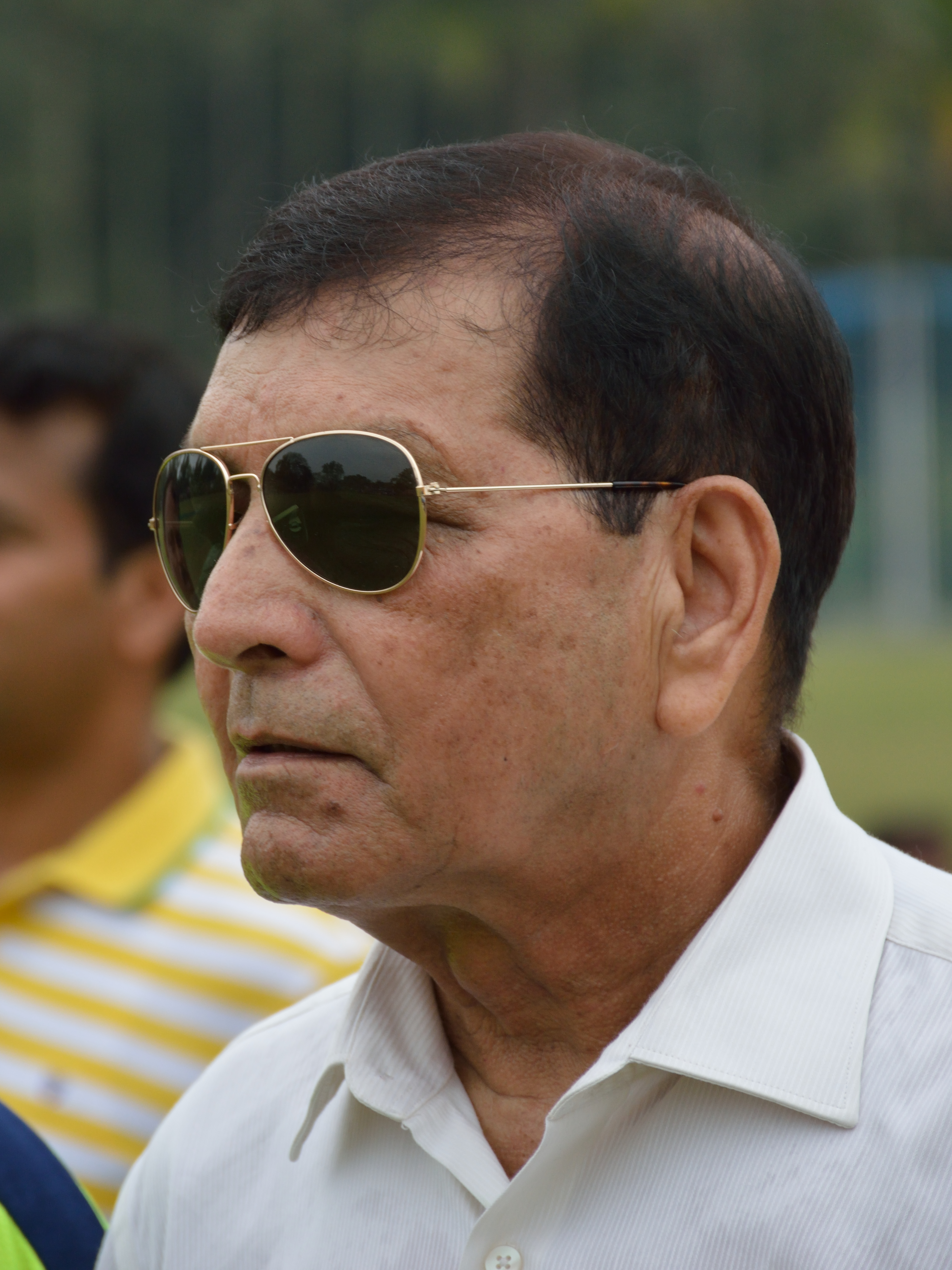
- Nayeemuddin in 2016

Personal information
- Full name: Syed Nayeemuddin
- Date of birth: 1944 (age 81–82)
- Place of birth: Hyderabad, Nizam Rule, British India (present-day Telangana, India)
- Position: Defender

Senior career*
Years	Team	Apps	(Gls)
1962–1966	Hyderabad City Police		
1966–1968	East Bengal		
1968–1970	Mohun Bagan		
1970	East Bengal		
1971–1972	Mohammedan		
1972–1973	Mohun Bagan		
197?–?	Mohammedan		

International career
1964–1971	India		

Managerial career
- 1982–1985: Mohammedan
- 1985–1986: India U-17
- 1986–1987: India
- 1990–1992: East Bengal
- 1992–1994: Mohun Bagan
- 1994–1996: East Bengal
- 1997–1998: India
- 2003–2004: Brothers Union
- 2004–2005: Mahindra United
- 2005–2006: India
- 2007–2016: Brothers Union
- 2016: Brothers Union
- 2007–2008: Bangladesh
- 2017: Dhaka Mohammedan
- 2018–2019: Brothers Union
Medal record
Men's football
Representing India
AFC Asian Cup
Runner-up	1964 Israel	Team
Asian Games
Bronze medal – third place	1970 Bangkok	Team
- * Club domestic league appearances and goals

Syed Nayeemuddin (born 1944), known as Nayeem, is an Indian football coach and former player. He played for and captained the India national team. He later managed Mahindra United, Brothers Union, Dhaka Mohammedan, and Bangladesh national team.

Nayeemuddin is among the earliest sportspersons to win both the Arjuna Award (received the award by the Government of India in 1970) and Dronacharya Award, recognising his contribution to the sport.

== Playing career ==
Nayeemuddin began his club football career in 1962 with Hyderabad City Police (now known as "Andhra Pradesh Police"), which was then a renowned side in Indian club football. In an interview to Scroll.in, Balai Dey (one of the few footballers who represented both India and Pakistan in international football) said that he was most impressed by players like Chuni Goswami and Syed Nayeemuddin during his playing days with Kolkata clubs. In 1968, Nayeemuddin joined Mohun Bagan and played under "diamond coach" Amal Dutta, and won the 1969 IFA Shield with a 3–1 victory against East Bengal in the final. Nayeemuddin later joined Mohun Bagan and was part of the team that went to a newly independent Bangladesh in May 1972, where they defeated Dhaka Mohammedan in their first match, but lost to Shadhin Bangla football team later.

He made his senior international debut for Syed Abdul Rahim managed India in 1964. In that year, he was part of the Indian team that finished as runners-up at the 1964 AFC Asian Cup, losing to Israel. He captained the India national team that won a bronze medal at the 1970 Asian Games in Bangkok, and was also a member of the team that won Pesta Sukan Cup in 1971 in Singapore. With India, he also appeared in the 1968 Merdeka Cup under coach Sailen Manna, and in the 1969 Merdeka Cup, managed by Jarnail Singh.

Nayeemuddin represented Bengal in Santosh Trophy in 1970–71, in which they lost to Punjab in the semi-final. As one of the best Indian defenders during his playing days, Nayeemuddin was part of the country's solid defensive trio in the 1960s, along with Jarnail Singh and Arun Ghosh.

== Managerial career ==
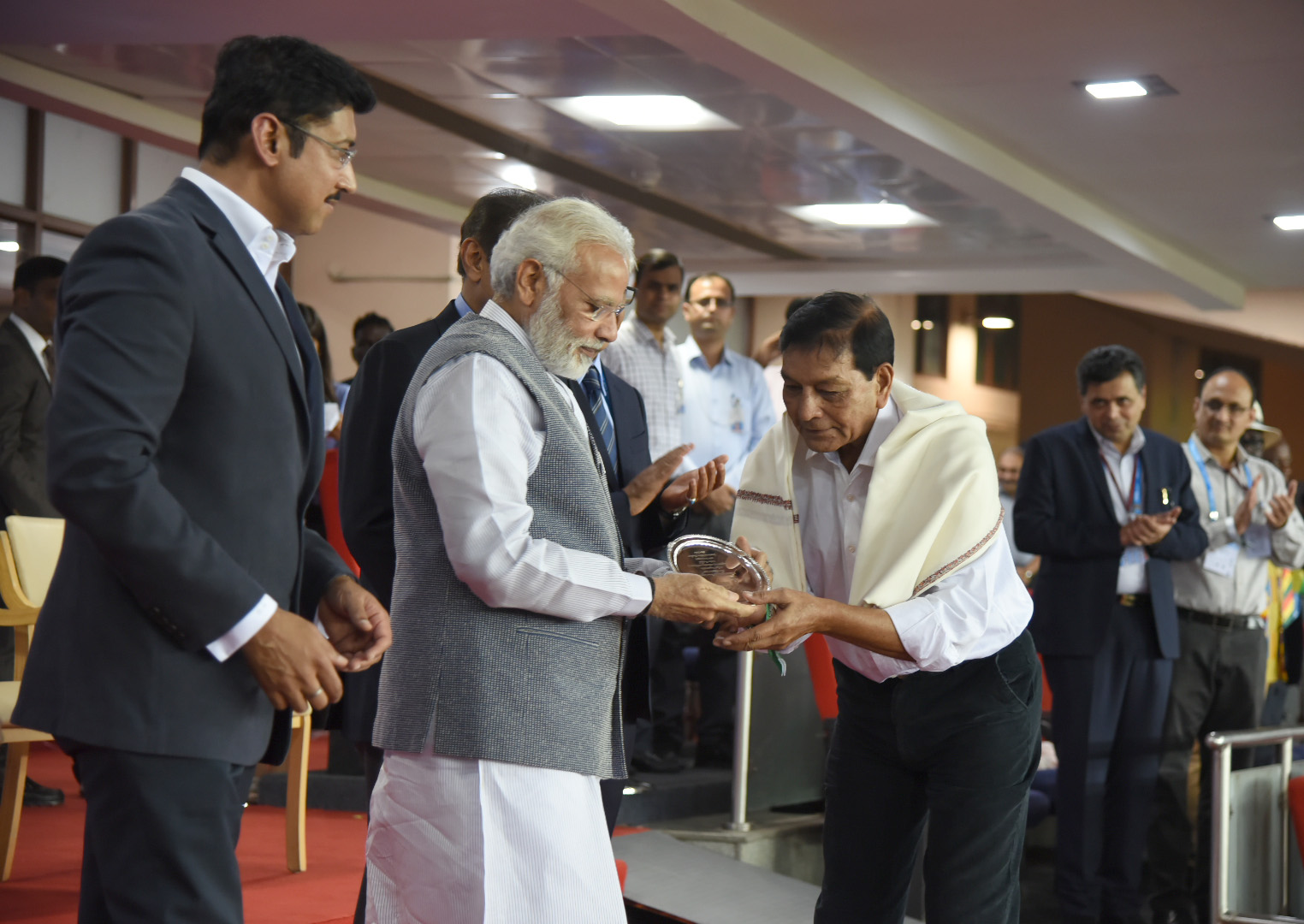
Nayeemuddin being felicitated by the Prime Minister of India, Narendra Modi, at the grand opening of 2017 FIFA U-17 World Cup in New Delhi.

After managing Mohammedan Sporting from 1982 to 1985, Nayeemuddin was appointed head coach of India U17 team and guided the team in 1985 AFC U-16 Championship qualifiers. They failed to qualify the main round but managed to win 13–0 against Macau, which is still the biggest win of India. In 1987, Nayeemuddin became assistant coach of Amal Dutta managed India, and guided the team clinching gold medal at the Calcutta South Asian Games. The next year, he became head coach and Dutta became technical director.

In 1990, he was appointed as head coach of East Bengal. In his first season, he led the club to their second Triple-crown of Indian football (IFA Shield, Durand Cup, and Rovers Cup). He helped East Bengal winning six trophies in two seasons in his first stint with the club. He was again appointed as the head coach in 1994 when he again led the team to seven trophies in two seasons. He had one more stint as the head coach in 2000 and holds the record of winning eighteen trophies as the head coach of the club, only second to P. K. Banerjee. In East Bengal, he nurtured Indian talents including Babu Mani, Bikash Panji, Krishanu Dey, and transformed Bhaichung Bhutia from a midfielder to striker.

From 1992 to 1994, he managed Mohun Bagan. The club defended their Rovers Cup title and won Federation Cup in 1992. Under his coaching, Mohun Bagan defeated Croatian First Football League club Varteks in 1994 DCM Trophy. At that time, his team participated in 1993–94 Asian Club Championship, won against Maldivian side Club Valencia and Sri Lankan club Ratnam in preliminary stages, but lost 4–0 to Thai Farmers' Bank in the first leg of second round, and refused to play the 2nd leg in Malaysia.

Nayeemuddin was appointed coach of India national team in 1997. He won the South Asian Football Federation Cup by beating the Maldives 5–1 and reached the semi-finals of the Nehru Cup for the first time. His time in charge of the national team was blighted with no practice matches between September 1997 and November 1998 before the 1998 Asian Games. He managed the team in 1998 Asian Games held at Bangkok, where they reached second round.

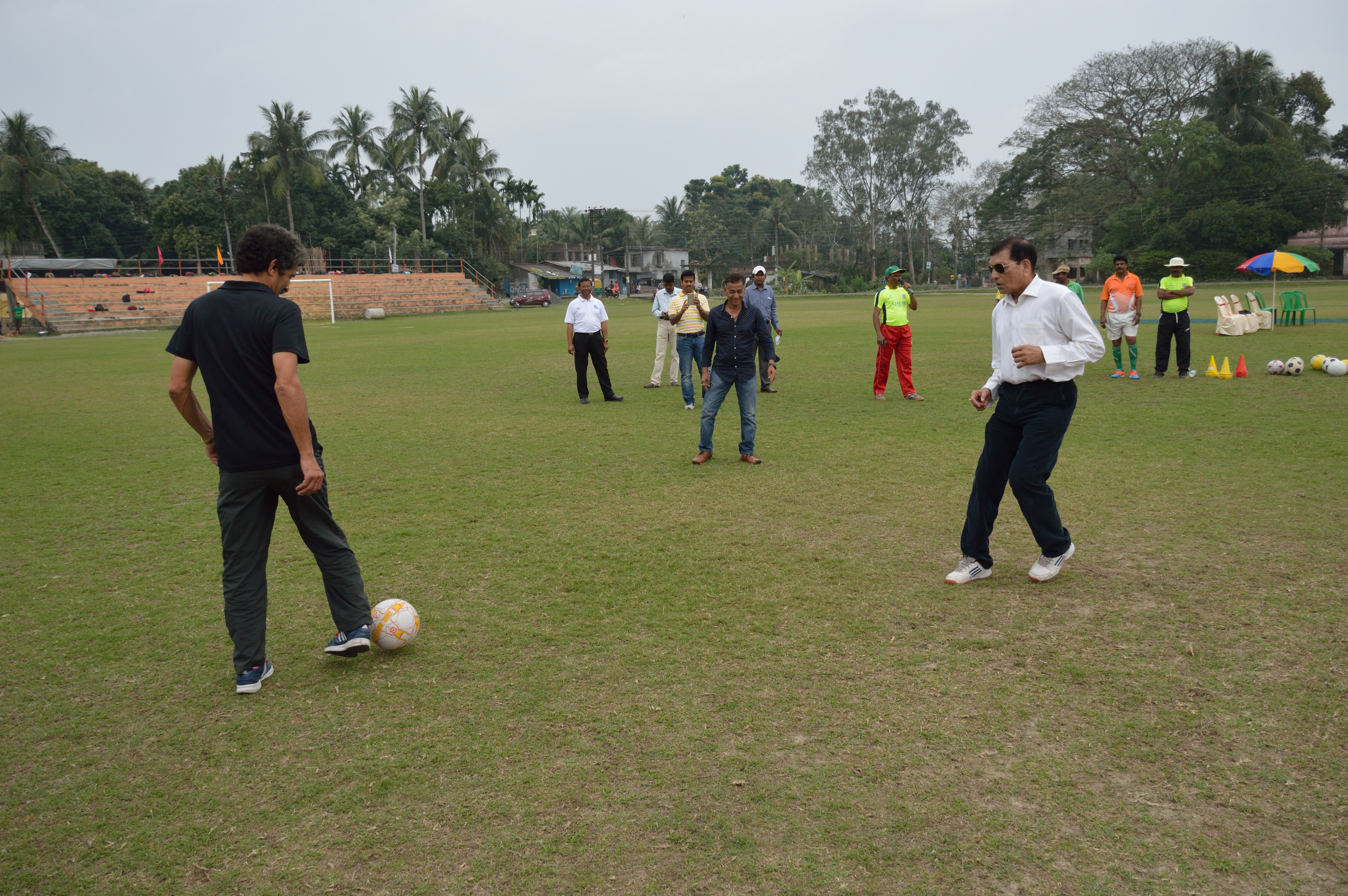
Nayeemuddin (in right) showing his skills with Iranian footballer Jamshid Nassiri at a football workshop in Baruipur, South 24 Parganas, February 2016.

His tenure with India ended after the games in December 1998. Nayeemuddin in 1999, guided Mohun Bagan at the 1999–2000 Asian Club Championship. His second role with India began when he succeeded Sukhwinder Singh as India coach in 2005, but left in 2006 after poor performances against Japan and Yemen when qualifying for the 2007 Asian Cup. He helped Bangladeshi club Brothers Union win their first ever Premier Division League title during the 2003–04 season and after coaching in India for a couple of years, he returned to Brothers Union, where he remained from 2007 to 2016. He has previously managed Bengal Mumbai in the Mumbai Football League.

In July 2007, he was appointed as head coach of Bangladesh ahead of the 2007 Nehru Cup in New Delhi and India. He stayed at the post until 2008.

I don't have any idea about the current Mohammedan squad, but I'm sure those who are going to play have the talent to represent Mohammedan. I believe in hard work. I just need one percent of talent and 99 percent of hard work to get success. I will build players through hard work. I have to do something as I have taken the responsibility. My first target is the Federation Cup and then I want to go step by step.

— Syed Naeemuddin, after his appointment as head coach of Mohammedan Sporting (Dhaka).

Nayeemuddin last managed Dhaka Mohammedan, a Bangladeshi club, from May to October 2017.

In April 2022 on the occasion of Dawat-e-Iftar (transl. Iftar Dinner), Nayeemuddin was awarded the Shaan-e-Mohammedan (transl. 'Pride of Mohammedan') by Mohammedan Sporting, which is the lifetime achievement award presented by the club annually since 2015, to respect and laud footballing personalities for their indispensable contribution to the club during their career.

== Honours ==
=== Player ===
India

- AFC Asian Cup runner-up: 1964
- Asian Games Bronze Medal: 1970
- Merdeka Tournament runner-up: 1964; third-place: 1966, 1970
- Pesta Sukan Cup (Singapore): 1971

Hyderabad City Police

- Durand Cup runner-up: 1963
- Rovers Cup: 1962, 1963–64.
- DCM Trophy: 1965; runner-up 1964.

East Bengal

- IFA Shield: 1966, 1970
- Rovers Cup: 1967
- Calcutta Football League: 1966, 1970
- Durand Cup: 1967, 1970

Mohun Bagan

- IFA Shield: 1969
- Rovers Cup: 1968, 1970
- Calcutta Football League: 1969

Mohammedan Sporting

- IFA Shield: 1971
- Sait Nagjee Trophy: 1971
- Independence Day Cup: 1971, 1972
- Calcutta Football League runner-up: 1971
- Bordoloi Trophy runner-up: 1971

=== Manager ===
India

- SAFF Championship: 1997, 2005

Mahindra United

- Indian Federation Cup: 2005

East Bengal

- Calcutta Football League: 1991, 1995, 2000
- IFA Shield: 1990, 1991, 1994, 1995, 2000
- Durand Cup: 1990, 1991, 1995
- Rovers Cup: 1990, 1994

Brothers Union

- Premier Division League (Dhaka): 2003–04
- National League: 2004

=== Individual ===
- Arjuna Award: 1970
- Mohun Bagan Ratna: 2016
- Shaan-e-Mohammedan: 2022
- Dronacharya Award: 1990

== See also ==
- List of National Sports Award recipients in Olympic sports
- List of India national football team captains
- List of India national football team managers
- List of East Bengal Club coaches
- History of the India national football team

== Bibliography ==
- Kapadia, Novy (2017). Barefoot to Boots: The Many Lives of Indian Football. Penguin Random House. ISBN 978-0-143-42641-7.
- Martinez, Dolores; Mukharjiim, Projit B (2009). Football: From England to the World: The Many Lives of Indian Football. Routledge. ISBN 978-1-138-88353-6. Archived from the original on 2 July 2022.
- Nath, Nirmal (2011). History of Indian Football: Upto 2009–10. Readers Service. ISBN 9788187891963. Archived from the original on 22 July 2022.
- Dineo, Paul; Mills, James (2001). Soccer in South Asia: Empire, Nation, Diaspora. London, United Kingdom: Frank Cass Publishers. ISBN 978-0-7146-8170-2. Archived from the original on 25 July 2022.
- "Triumphs and Disasters: The Story of Indian Football, 1889—2000" (PDF). Archived from the original (PDF) on 13 August 2012.
- Mukhopadhay, Subir (2018). সোনায় লেখা ইতিহাসে মোহনবাগান (transl. Mohun Bagan in the history written in gold). ISBN 978-93-850172-0-9.
- Majumdar, Boria; Bandyopadhyay, Kausik (2006). A Social History Of Indian Football: Striving To Score. Routledge. ISBN 9780415348355. Archived from the original on 29 June 2021.
- Basu, Jaydeep (2003). Stories from Indian Football. UBS Publishers' Distributors. ISBN 9788174764546. Archived from the original on 11 October 2022.
- Banerjee, Argha; Basu, Rupak (2022). মোহনবাগান: সবুজ ঘাসের মেরুন গল্প (transl. Mohun Bagan: Green fields' Maroon stories). Shalidhan. ISBN 978-81-954667-0-2.
