= Mario Rivera (football manager) =

Spanish football manager

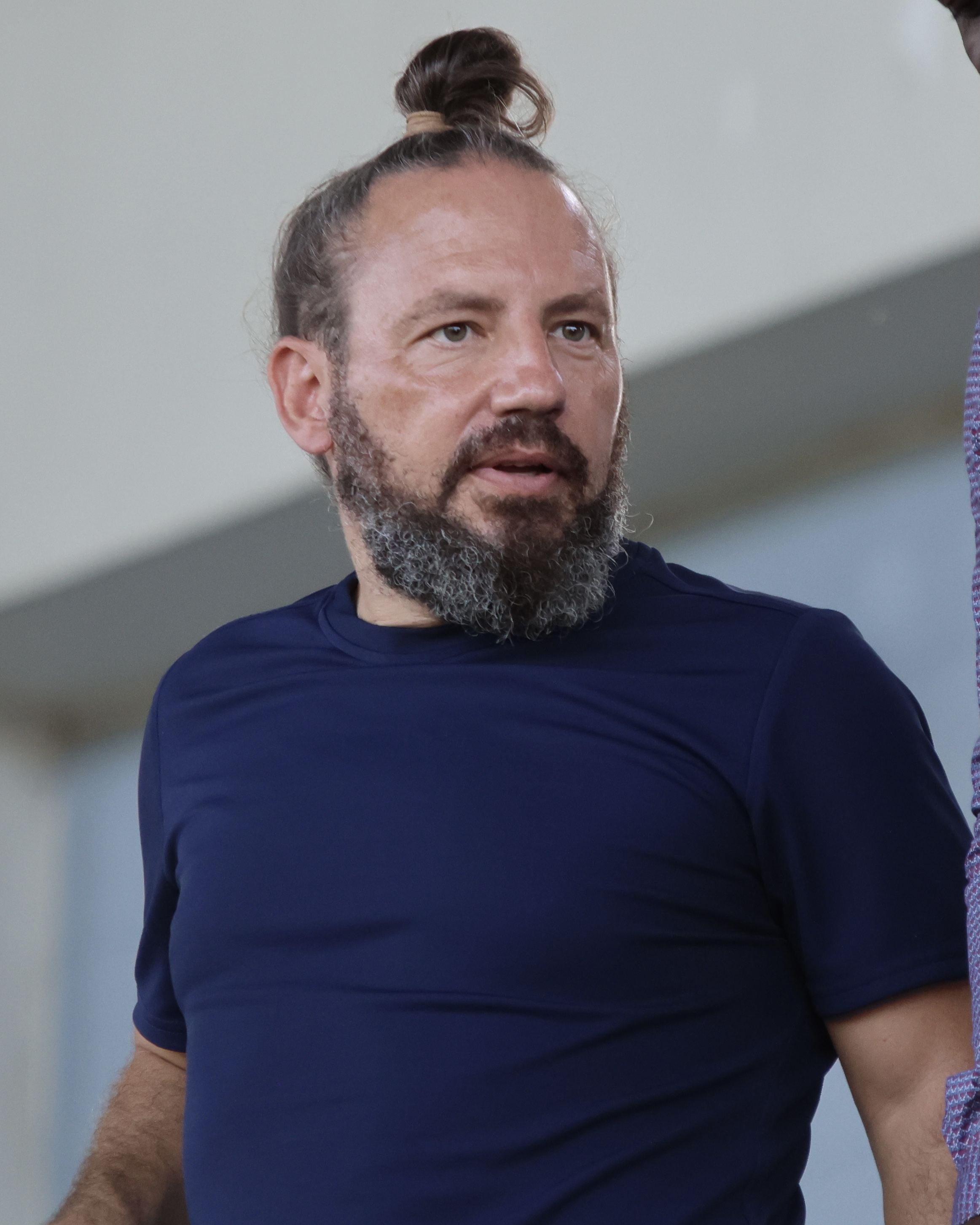
- Rivera in 2022

Personal information
- Full name: Mario Rivera Campesino
- Date of birth: 13 August 1977 (age 49)
- Place of birth: Madrid, Spain
- Height: 1.72 m (5 ft 8 in)

Managerial career
- Years: Team
- 2007–2009: Leganés (youth)
- 2009–2010: Betis San Isidro
- 2010–2011: Celtic (scout)
- 2011–2012: Atlético Madrid C (video analyst)
- 2012–2013: Collado Villalba
- 2013–2014: Los Yébenes
- 2016–2017: SD Leioa (video analyst)
- 2017–2018: Brunei U21
- 2018–2019: East Bengal (assistant)
- 2020: East Bengal
- 2022: East Bengal
- 2022–2024: Brunei
- 2025–: Al-Nasr (assistant)

Mario Rivera Campesino (born 12 August 1977) is a Spanish professional football manager who is currently assistant coach at Al-Nasr Libya.

== Career ==
Rivera started his managerial career with Leganés youth team in 2007. He then proceeded manage different local clubs, worked as a scout and analyst for Celtic and Atlético Madrid C. In 2018, he was appointed as the head coach of Brunei U21 team. In 2018 he joined East Bengal as an assistant coach and video analyst, along with head coach Alejandro Menéndez. He left after the end of the season and was replaced by Josep Ferré. On 23 January 2020, Rivera rejoined East Bengal as the head coach after Alejandro Menéndez stepped down.

On 1 January 2022, Rivera was again appointed as the head coach of East Bengal in Indian Super League, succeeding Manolo Díaz following the latter's midway resign during the tournament.

On 20 September the same year, he was unveiled as the head coach of the Brunei national football team, returning to the Abode of Peace four years after coaching the Under-21s for the 2018 Hassanal Bolkiah Trophy. He successfully coached the Wasps to qualification for the 2022 AFF Championship in November. He was relieved from his post in June 2024.

In February 2025, Rivera was announced as part of a new backroom staff at Al-Nasr, becoming assistant to Miguel Ángel Gamondi.

== Managerial statistics ==
As of matches played 26 March 2024

Managerial record by team and tenure
Team	From	To	Record								Ref.
Team	From	To	M	W	D	L	GF	GA	GD	Win %	Ref.
East Bengal	23 January 2020	31 May 2020	8	3	3	2	11	8	+3	37.50	
East Bengal	1 January 2022	20 July 2022	6	1	1	4	6	13	−7	16.67	
Brunei	20 September 2022	7 June 2024	14	3	0	11	13	57	−44	21.43	
Total			28	7	4	17	30	78	−48	25.00	
