= Tarun Dey =

Indian football Defender

Personal information
- Place of birth: India
- Position: Defender

Senior career*
| Years | Team | Apps | (Gls) |
| 1982–1994 | East Bengal Club | | |

International career
| | India | 53 | (0) |
- * Club domestic league appearances and goals

Tarun Dey is a retired Indian football defender who represented India at the 1984 Asian Cup. He also played for East Bengal Club and was awarded the Man of the tournament of the 1985 Coca-Cola Cup.

Dey is also a qualified AFC coach and managed East Bengal youth team as assistant coach.

== Club career ==
He joined Calcutta Football League club East Bengal in 1982 and captained the team in 1986–87. They later won Federation Cup and qualified for 1985–86 Asian Club Championship. As part of Central Asia Zone (tournament was named "Coca-Cola Cup"), the club managed by legendary footballer and Olympian P. K. Banerjee, defeated New Road Team by 7–0, Abahani Krira Chakra 1–0, Club Valencia 9–0. Dey was awarded the Man of the Tournament award.

== Honours ==
East Bengal

- Federation Cup: 1985
- IFA Shield: 1984, 1986, 1990, 1991, 1994
- Durand Cup: 1989, 1990, 1991, 1993
- Calcutta Football League: 1985, 1987, 1988, 1989, 1991, 1993
- Rovers Cup: 1990, 1994
- Coca Cola Cup: 1985
- Bordoloi Trophy: 1992
- All Airlines Gold Cup: 1987, 1988, 1990, 1992
- Darjeeling Gold Cup: 1985
- SSS Trophy: 1989, 1991
- Sait Nagjee Trophy: 1986
- Stafford Cup: 1986

India

- South Asian Games Gold medal: 1987; Bronze medal: 1989

== See also ==
- List of East Bengal Club captains

== Bibliography ==
- Kapadia, Novy (2017). Barefoot to Boots: The Many Lives of Indian Football. Penguin Random House. ISBN 978-0-143-42641-7.
- Martinez, Dolores; Mukharjiim, Projit B (2009). Football: From England to the World: The Many Lives of Indian Football. Routledge. ISBN 978-1-138-88353-6. Archived from the original on 2 July 2022.
- Nath, Nirmal (2011). History of Indian Football: Upto 2009–10. Readers Service. ISBN 9788187891963. Archived from the original on 22 July 2022.
- Roy, Gautam (1 January 2021). East Bengal 100. Allsport Foundation. ISBN 978-8194763109.
- Chattopadhyay, Hariprasad (2017). Mohun Bagan–East Bengal (in Bengali). Kolkata: Parul Prakashan.
