= Tollygunge Agragami FC =

Indian association football club based in Kolkata

Tollygunge Agragami
- Full name: Tollygunge Agragami Football Club
- Nickname: Agragami (The Pioneer)
- Short name: TAFC
- Founded: 1943; 83 years ago (as Russa Agragami Samity)
- Ground: Rabindra Sarobar Stadium
- Capacity: 22,000
- Chairman: Subhankar Ghosh Dostider
- Head coach: Arindam Deb
- League: CFL 1st division
Home colours	Away colours

Tollygunge Agragami Football Club is an Indian professional multi-sports club best known for its football section. It is based in Tollygunge, Kolkata, West Bengal. Founded in 1943 as "Russa Agragami Samity", the club competed in the Calcutta Premier Division League prior to relegation in 2025.

Tollygunge Agragami previously participated in the National Football League, then top flight of the Indian football league system. They have also appeared in the I-League 2nd Division.

== History ==
=== Early history ===
Former crest of Tollygunge Agragami

Tollygunge Agragami, as a football club, founded in Kolkata, India, during the British raj. The team was incorporated in 1943 as Russa Agragami Samity. It was later renamed to "Tollygunge Agragami" in 1955. The club uses Rabindra Sarobar Stadium as its home ground, which has a capacity of 22,000. Although the team has not been as successful as their city rivals, East Bengal Club, Mohun Bagan AC, alongside Mohammedan Sporting, but they are a team to watch out for.

The club in 1971, reached the final of prestigious IFA Shield, but was defeated by Mohamedan Sporting 2–0. The team was then managed by legendary coach Sushil Bhattacharya, who guided them earning promotion to Calcutta Football League first division. Winning the 1997–98 season of the National Football League 2nd Division, is Tollygunge's biggest achievement since their inception. Nepali international Hari Khadka donned in the club colours in 1996–97 season. Amal Dutta became Tollygunge coach in 1999, helped the club reaching final of the 105th edition of IFA Shield in that year.

In July 2000, after a brilliant display at the NFL, Tollygunge goalkeeper Prasanta Dora was included in Sukhwinder Singh managed national team of India during their historic England-tour, where they played three matches against English Premier League sides Fulham, West Bromwich Albion, and arch-rival Bangladesh.

=== Present years ===
Tollygunge Agragami participated in the 2018 Calcutta Premier Division playoffs, finishing tenth. They were relegated to the Calcutta Premier Division B and defeated Mohammedan Sporting by 2–1. They won two matches, drew two, and lost the rest. They did not qualify for Calcutta Premier Division A in 2019 and 2020.

In 2021, Tollygunge announced Modern Institute of Engineering and Technology as their main sponsor ahead of the 2021 CFL Premier Division.

In June 2023, the Indian Football Association (IFA) announced the merger of both Premier Division A and B of the Calcutta Football League, ahead of its 125th edition, in which Tollygunge Agragami was placed within Group I.

== National Football League seasons ==
In 1998, Tollygunge Agragami emerged as one of the finest sides from Kolkata to participate in the inaugural National Football League, then top tier Indian football league system. They finished as 4th in the Group A of the 1998–99 National Football League with 14 points. In the 1999–2000 National Football League, they again competed with the top clubs and finished as 8th with 26 points, behind East Bengal FC. In the fifth season of the National Football League, the club competed bravely, finishing 8th again with 24 points. Tollygunge enjoyed their back to back appearances in the top flight league in which they finished 9th in the 2001–02 National Football League (sixth season) with 23 points.

In the 2002–03 National Football League, they again finished 9th with 23 points. The 2003–04 National Football League was tough for them, where they finished 10th behind the giants Mohun Bagan A.C. with only 20 points. In 2004–05 National Football League, Tollygunge relegated after finishing at the bottom with 17 points. They lost 11 games and won only 3, as East Bengal FC and Vasco SC thrashed Tollygunge by 5–0 respectively and Mohun Bagan rout them by 4–0.

== Sponsorship history ==
In 1999–2000, the club was known as "Manaksia Tollygunge Agragami" due to their sponsorship ties with Manaksia Steel Company. In January 2003, Indian courier company DTDC Express Limited was unveiled as club's title sponsor. In 2011, Tollygunge Agragami roped in Kolkata Weir Industries Ltd (KWIL) as their main sponsor. In 2014, the club entered into a sponsorship of Shree Venkatesh Films, and registered by the name of "Tollygunge Agragami SVF Football Club Private Limited".

In 2015, the club acquired service of Trak-Only as their main shirt sponsor.

== Home grounds ==
The club plays its home matches at the Rabindra Sarobar Stadium which is located in Lake Gardens, Kolkata.

22,000 seater Kishore Bharati Krirangan, located in Jadavpur, was used as the home ground of Tollygunge Agragami for both the National Football League and Calcutta Football League for a long time.

== Rivalry ==
Tollygunge has the rivalries with other two Calcutta Football League sides Kalighat Milan Sangha and Bhawanipore FC, which is often referred to as the "South Kolkata Derby".

=== South Kolkata Derby ===
Opponent	Played	Wins	Draws	Losses
Tollygunge Agragami	6	0	6	0
Kalighat Milan Sangha	7	1	6	0
Bhawanipore	5	0	4	1
Total	18	1	16	1

== Managerial history ==
- (India) Sushil Bhattacharya (1970–1972)
- (India) Amal Dutta (1999–2000)
- (India) Shankar Mitra (2000–2001)
- (India) Aloke Mukherjee (2001–2002)
- (India) Chandu Roy Chowdhury (2002)
- (India) Amal Dutta (2002–2003)
- (India) Subrata Bhattacharya (2003)
- (India) Krishnendu Roy (2003–2004; 2005)
- (India) Swarup Das (2011)
- (India) Mridul Banerjee (2011–2013)
- (India) Bastob Ray (2013)
- (India) Subrata Bhattacharya (2013–2014)
- (India) Ranjan Chaudhuri (2015–2016)
- (India) Monoranjan Bhattacharya (2018)
- (India) Bimal Ghosh (2018–2019)
- (India) Arindam Deb (2023–present)

== Notable players ==
For all current and former notable Tollygunge Agragami players with a Wikipedia article, see: Category:Tollygunge Agragami FC players.

World Cup player

- Anthony Wolfe (2017) – appeared at the 2006 FIFA World Cup in Germany, representing Trinidad and Tobago.

Other players

- (India) Ashim Biswas (2001–2003) – won both the IndianFootball.com 'player of the Year' and 'rookie of the year' award with Tollygunge Agragami in 2003.
- Hari Khadka (1996–1997) – all-time top goalscorer of Nepal.
- (India) Deepak Mondal (2017–2018) – recipient of both the Arjuna Award and AIFF Player of the Year.

== Honours ==
=== League ===
- National Football League II
  - Champions (1): 1997–98
- Calcutta Football League
  - Runners-up (2): 1996–97, 2014
  - Third place (7): 1997–98, 1998–99, 1999–00, 2001, 2002, 2003, 2014–15
- CFL Second Division League
  - Third place (1): 2007

=== Cup ===
- IFA Shield (Note: Fourth oldest football tournament, organized by the IFA (W.B.), and played between the local clubs of West Bengal and other invited ones.)
  - Runners-up (2): 1971, 1999
- All Airlines Gold Cup
  - Runners-up (3): 1998, 2000, 2002
- McDowell's Cup
  - Champions (1): 1999
- Yamaha Libero Cup
  - Champions (1): 2003

== Other departments ==
=== Men's cricket ===
Tollygunge Agragami is having its men's cricket section. It is under the state jurisdiction of Cricket Association of Bengal (CAB), which is governing body of cricket in West Bengal, and competes in CAB First Division League, J.C. Mukherjee T-20 Trophy and other tournaments.

=== Tennis ===
Tollygunge Agragami has a tennis department and the club is an affiliated member of the Bengal Tennis Association (BTA).

== Affiliated club(s) ==
In 1985, Tollygunge Agragami became affiliated with fellow CFL Premier Division side Russa United Club, and formed a football academy alongside operating coaching camps in Kolkata.

== See also ==
- Football in Kolkata
- List of football clubs in Kolkata
- List of football clubs in India
