= Bastob Roy =

Indian footballer and coach

Bastob Roy বাস্তব রায়
Personal information
- Place of birth: Uttarpara, West Bengal, India

Senior career*
Years	Team	Apps	(Gls)
- Mohun Bagan
- Mohammedan
- Tollygunge Agragami
- George Telegraph

Managerial career
- 2015–2018: ATK (assistant)
- 2018: East Bengal
- 2018–2020: East Bengal (assistant)
- 2022–2026: Mohun Bagan/Reserves
- * Club domestic league appearances and goals

Bastob Roy is an Indian former professional football player and current coach. During his playing days, Roy played for Mohun Bagan, Mohammedan, Tollygunge Agragami, and George Telegraph.

== Coaching career ==
On 28 July 2015 it was announced that Roy would become the assistant coach of Indian Super League side Atlético de Kolkata. Roy was made the head coach of the under-23 side. On 28 October 2016, after the suspension of Kolkata's head coach, José Francisco Molina, Roy was confirmed to take charge of the side for their match against NorthEast United. Despite going down 1–0, Atlético de Kolkata came back to win 2–1 and move to first place.
