= Bhaskar Ganguly =

Indian footballer

Bhaskar Ganguly is a former Indian football goalkeeper from West Bengal. He was the captain of India national football team which participated in the 1982 Asian Games held in New Delhi.

Ganguly during his playing days

Ganguly is one of the few Indian players who went abroad, joining foreign clubs, when he along with Monoranjan Bhattacharya signed with Dhaka Abahani and appeared in tournaments in Bangladesh.

== Playing career ==
Ganguly served in Indian team in several International soccer tournaments with great success during his career in the club from 1976 to 1989 and again from 1991 to 1992, and captained the team in 1984–85. As one of the best Indian goalkeepers ever, he played under coaching of Sushil Bhattacharya. He as goalkeeper and Monoranjan Bhattacharjee as stopper back made East Bengal defence absolutely impregnable.

== Honours ==
East Bengal

- Federation Cup: 1978–79

Individual

- East Bengal "Lifetime Achievement Award": 2019
- Shaan-e-Mohammedan: 2023

== See also ==
- List of India national football team captains
- List of Indian expatriate footballers
