= I-League monthly awards =

Monthly awards in the I-League

This is an association football award that recognises the best I-League coach and player each month of the season. It was started in 2019-20 season. Alejandro Menéndez of East Bengal FC and Fran González of Mohun Bagan AC were the first coach and player of December, respectively.

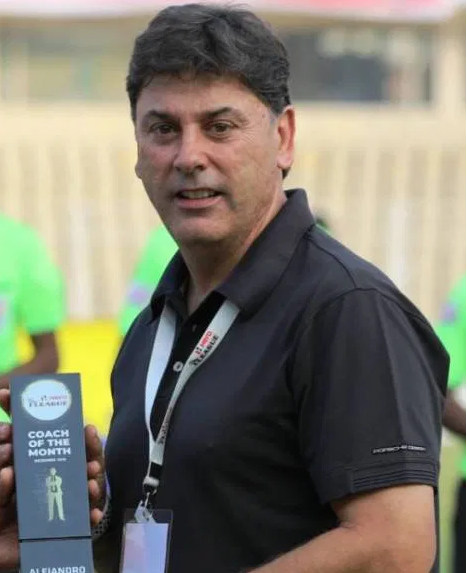
Alejandro Menéndez with I-League coach of the month award (December 2019)

== Coach of the month ==
=== Winners ===
Month	Year	Nationality	Coach	Team	Ref
December	2019	Spain	Alejandro Menéndez	East Bengal	
January	2020	Spain	Kibu Vicuña	Mohun Bagan	
February	2020	Spain	Kibu Vicuña	Mohun Bagan	
January	2021	Spain	Fernando Varela	Churchill Brothers	
February	2021	Ireland	Curtis Fleming	Punjab	
March	2021	India	L. Nandakumar Singh	TRAU	
March	2022	Russia	Andrey Chernyshov	Mohammedan	

=== Awards won by nationality ===
Country	Wins
Spain	4
India	1
Ireland	1
Russia	1

=== Awards won by club ===
Club	Wins
Mohun Bagan	2
Churchill Brothers	1
East Bengal	1
Mohammedan	1
Punjab	1
TRAU	1

== Player of the month ==
=== Winner ===
Month	Year	Nationality	Player	Team	Ref
December	2019	Spain	Fran González	Mohun Bagan	
January	2020	Cameroon	Pierrick Dipanda	Punjab	
February	2020	Spain	Joseba Beitia	Mohun Bagan	
January	2021	Honduras	Clayvin Zuniga	Churchill Brothers	
February	2021	Nepal	Kiran Limbu	Punjab	
March	2021	Brazil	Helder Ribeiro	TRAU	
March	2022	Trinidad and Tobago	Marcus Joseph	Mohammedan	

=== Awards won by nationality ===
Country	Wins
Spain	2
Brazil	1
Cameroon	1
Honduras	1
Nepal	1
Trinidad and Tobago	1

=== Awards won by club ===
Club	Wins
Mohun Bagan	2
Punjab	2
Churchill Brothers	1
Mohammedan	1
TRAU	1
