= Marcos Falopa =

Brazilian football manager (born 1949)

Personal information
- Full name: Marcos Antonio Falopa
- Date of birth: 2 April 1949 (age 77)
- Place of birth: Brazil

Senior career*
Years	Team	Apps	(Gls)
1961–1963	Palmeiras (futsal)		
1964–1966	Palmeiras		
1970–1971	São Caetano		
1972–1975	Universidade de Santo Andre		

Managerial career
- 1974–1975: Comercial FC
- 1977–1978: Marília AC
- 1979–1982: Al-Khor SC
- 1983–1985: Manama Club
- 1985–1986: Al Shabab
- 1986–1988: Brazil (assistant)
- 1989–1990: Tonnerre
- 1990: Palmeiras
- 1991–1992: Nagoya Grampus
- 1993–1994: Mogi Mirim
- 1994–1995: Santos (Technical Director)
- 1995–2002: CONCACAF (Technical Director)
- 2002–2004: South Africa (Technical Director)
- 2005–2006: Oman (Technical Manager of Youth Team)
- 2007–2009: Myanmar
- 2011: Football Sports Integration & Football Academy, Italy
- 2011–2012: Rieti
- 2012: Coaching Director, ABTF (Brazil)
- 2013: East Bengal
- 2014–2015: Barbados
- * Club domestic league appearances and goals

Marcos Antonio Falopa (born 2 April 1949) is a Brazilian football manager. Falopa, who played for Palmeiras and Sao Caetano, is a qualified adviser and coaching instructor accredited by FIFA. Having graduated with a bachelor's degree in Sports & Physical Education, Falopa also earned a master's degree in Football from the University of São Paulo, and a UEFA Pro Coaching License (A). He has more than 35 years of experience in football.

== Playing career ==
Marcos Falopa grew up in São Paulo, where he played futsal professionally from 1961 to 1963 before moving on to football. He was a professional in Botafogo’s B team in Rio de Janeiro before moving to Sao Caetano in the first division, where he played from 1970 to 1971.

== Managerial and administrative career ==
=== Early career ===
After retiring, he enrolled at University of São Paulo and trained to become a coach. Since then, he has visited more than 100 countries to teach football. His most prominent coaching assignment was during 1986 through 1988, when he was the assistant manager of Brazil's national team. In 1995, Jack Warner hired Marcos Falopa to the position of CONCACAF Technical Director.

=== South Africa, Oman, and Myanmar ===
On 30 October 2002, Falopa was appointed technical director of the South African Football Association with a four-year contract. However, he resigned the post in 2004.

On 24 July 2005, he became the manager of Oman's under-17 national team with a one-year contract. In April 2007, he became the manager of the Myanmar national football team. During his regime, Myanmar's national team triumphed in the six-country Third Grand Royal Challenge Cup soccer tournament, hosted by Myanmar in November 2008, one year after finishing runners-up in both the 39th Merdeka football tournament in Malaysia in August 2007 and the 24th Southeast Asian (SEA) Games in Thailand in December 2007. His contract ended in December 2008.

=== East Bengal ===
On 12 June 2013, Falopa succeeded Trevor Morgan as the manager of East Bengal ahead of John van Loen and Rodolfo Zapata. He was assisted by his son Americo Falopa as the goalkeeping coach and physical trainer. His first assignment was to maintain the club's winning run in the AFC Cup. He was also approached by rivals Mohun Bagan to become the technical director of their youth academy. The father-son duo joined the team, known by their colours, Red and Gold, in July.

He won his first match against Semen Padang of Indonesia in the 2013 AFC Cup semi-final, maintaining the team's winning streak.

Falopa resigned from his position at East Bengal on 13 November 2013; Armando Colaco replaced him the next day.

=== Barbados ===
Falopa was appointed Technical Director of the Barbados Football Association and Head Coach of the Barbados team in 2014 and remained there a year, until his resignation following the elimination in the second round of qualifying for the FIFA World Cup 2018.
