= Aloke Mukherjee =

Indian footballer

Personal information
- Full name: Aloke Mukherjee অলোক মুখার্জি
- Date of birth: 1 May 1960 (age 66)
- Place of birth: Ichapur, North 24 Parganas, West Bengal, India
- Position: Left wing back

Senior career*
Years	Team	Apps	(Gls)
1978–1979	Eastern Railways		
1980	George Telegraph		
1981	Mohammedan		
1982–85	East Bengal		
1986–90	Mohun Bagan		
1991	East Bengal		
1992–94	Mohun Bagan		
1995–97	FCI		

International career
1981–88	India		

Managerial career
- 2004: India U20
- * Club domestic league appearances and goals

Aloke Mukherjee is an Indian former international football left back. He was active as a footballer from 1978 to 1997. He was named in the All Time best Eleven Indian Team by footballer and coach PK. Banerjee. He worked as deputy general manager and joint director–food in Food Corporation of India.

== Early life ==
Aloke Mukherjee was born to Jiban Krishna Mukherjee and Renuka Mukherjee in Ichapur, North 24 Parganas of West Bengal, and is a graduate from Ananda Mohan College of the University of Calcutta. During his school days, he participated in inter-school tournaments and in different districts of West Bengal.

== Career ==
Mukherjee was captain of the India national team during the 1980s. He represented India in various international tournaments from 1981 to 1988.

=== International tournaments ===
- Kings Cup ( Bangkok ) – 1981
- Asian Games – 1982, 1986
- Presidents Cup ( Seoul ) – 1982
- Nehru Cup – 1982, 83, 84, 85
- Pre Olympics – 1983
- Merdeka Cup – 1982, 86
- Great Wall Cup – 1984
- Pre world Cup – 1985
- SAF Games – 1985, 87 (gold medal winner)

=== Bengal ===
- Santosh Trophy – 1981 (winner), 82 (winner), 83, 84, 85, 86 (winner), 87, 88 (winner-captain), 93

=== Clubs ===
- Eastern Railways – 1978-79, was the paramount member of 78,79 Santosh Trophy for Railways.
- George Telegraph – 1980
- Mohammedan Sporting – 1981

=== Trophies won ===
- Calcutta Football League (3) – 1982, 85, 91
- Durand Cup (2) – 1982, 91
- IFA Shield (3) – 1983, 84, 91
- Federation Cup (1) – 1985
- DCM Trophy (1) – 1983
- Darjeeling Gold cup (2) – 1982, 85
- Negjee Trophy (1) – 1983
- Mohunbagan Club – 1986-90, 92-94
- Calcutta Football League(4) – 1986, 90, 92, 94
- Durand Cup (2) – 1986, 94
- IFA Shield (1) – 1987, 89
- Federation Cup (4) – 1986, 87, 92, 94
- Rovers Cup (2) – 1988, 92
- Sikkim Gold Cup (4) – 1986, 89, 92, 94
- All Airlines Gold Cup (1) – 1989
- JC Guha Memorial Trophy (1) – 1988
- Food Corporation of India – 1995, 96, 97

== Managerial career ==
Mukherjee was head coach of Bengal–Mohunbagan (2003), East Bengal (2008) and Mohammedan sporting club (2012-13). Under his coaching Mohunbagan club won the IFA Shield in 2003, defeating arch-rivals East Bengal club. As assistant coach of senior India, he participated in the Asian Games, LG Cup (winner in 2003), Afro Asian Games, Pre-World Cup, and SAF Games. He was chief coach of India in 2003 SAF Games held at Islamabad, where India were runners-up and recipients of the silver medal. Mukherjee was two times coach of Senior Bengal in the Santosh Trophy. Under his coaching Bengal U-21 team became a champion in Balia, Uttar Pradesh.

He has also managed then NFL side Tollygunge Agragami from 2001 to 2002.

He also managed Mohammadan SC in 2012–13 season.

== Awards ==
- Best Footballer of the year – 1981, 94
- Banglar Gaurav 2013 – State Government Award
- Mother Teresa International Award
