= Trevor Morgan (footballer) =

English footballer and coach

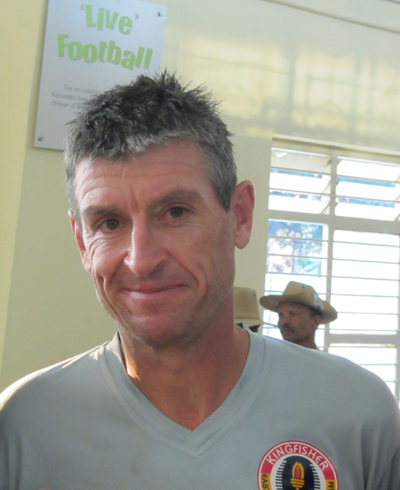
- Morgan with East Bengal

Personal information
- Full name: Trevor James Morgan
- Date of birth: 30 September 1956 (age 70)
- Place of birth: Forest Gate, England
- Height: 6 ft 1 in (1.85 m)
- Position: Centre forward

Youth career
- 19??–1979: Leytonstone
- 1979–1980: Leytonstone/Ilford

Senior career*
| Years | Team | Apps | (Gls) |
| 1980–1981 | AFC Bournemouth | 53 | (13) |
| 1981–1982 | Mansfield Town | 12 | (6) |
| 1982–1984 | AFC Bournemouth | 88 | (33) |
| 1984 | Bristol City | 32 | (8) |
| 1984–1985 | Exeter City | 31 | (9) |
| 1985 | St George | 13 | (8) |
| 1985–1987 | Bristol Rovers | 55 | (24) |
| 1987 | Bristol City | 19 | (7) |
| 1987–1989 | Bolton Wanderers | 77 | (17) |
| 1989–1990 | Shelbourne | ? | (4) |
| 1989–1990 | Colchester United | 32 | (12) |
| 1990–1991 | Exeter City | 17 | (3) |
| 1991 | Happy Valley | 5 | (4) |
| 1991–1993 | South China | 37 | (23) |
| 1993–1994 | Birmingham City | 1 | (0) |
| 1994–1995 | Exeter City | 9 | (1) |
| Total | | 481 | (172) |

Managerial career
- 1993–1994: Birmingham City (assistant)
- 1994–1995: Exeter City (assistant)
- 1995: Sorrento FC
- 2002–2003: Sengkang Marine
- 2004: Sarawak FA
- 2006–2007: Sengkang Punggol
- 2008–2009: Hull City (U-23)
- 2010: Sorrento FC
- 2010–2013: East Bengal
- 2014–2015: Kerala Blasters (assistant)
- 2015: Kerala Blasters (interim)
- 2015: Dempo
- 2016–2017: East Bengal
- 2018–2019: Bhutan
- 2018–2019: Pune City (assistant)
- 2020: United City
- 2021-2023: Sorrento FC
- * Club domestic league appearances and goals

Trevor James Morgan (born 30 September 1956) is an English football coach and former player.

== Playing career ==
Morgan played as a centre-forward. He signed his first professional contract in 1980 with AFC Bournemouth, and went on to make over 400 appearances for a variety of clubs in the lower leagues. In 1987, he joined Bristol City from rivals Bristol Rovers, for a fee of £10,000. No players would make the same move until Matty Taylor, 30 years later in January 2017. He scored several times that season helping Bristol City secure promotion to the Third Division.

== Coaching career ==
Morgan's first coaching role was as assistant to Terry Cooper at Birmingham City. He had previously been signed by Cooper four times as a player. He followed Cooper to Exeter, but left when the club went into administration. His next job was in Australia, as a coach at Perth club Sorrento. During this time, he took Australian citizenship.

After four years, he moved to Singapore as manager of Sengkang Marine FC. In 2004, Morgan went to Malaysia after being appointed as Sarawak FA head coach for upcoming newly formed, Malaysia Super League. It turned out to be disastrous season for both party, after bad performances led them to bottom of the league and he was fired from the post before being replaced by former head coach, Abdul Jalil Ramli. He then takes over the head coach role at his former club Sengkang Marine, now renamed Sengkang Punggol FC in 2006 before leaving the club by mutual consent at the end of the 2007 season.

He returned to Sorrento before being offered the role of Development Coach at Hull City by former Bolton Wanderers colleague Phil Brown.

During the summer of 2010, Morgan signed for Kingfisher East Bengal F.C. of the I-League in India. It did not take him long to make his mark as during his first competition with the club he won the tournament. This tournament was the Federation Cup where he managed East Bengal to victory over their rivals Mohun Bagan A.C. in the Final. In the same season East Bengal also won Kolkata Premier League and Mohammedan Platinum Jubilee Cup and finished 2nd in I-League.

In the 2011–12 I-League, Kingfisher East Bengal F.C. finished runner-up and turned up as second placed in the Federation cup having won the IFA Shield later. East Bengal managed to win the Super Cup that season. On 14 May 2012, he guided East Bengal to win the Calcutta Premier League, making it three trophies for the season but resigned on the same day after the match citing differences with club officials. Officials continued to talk to him to reinstate Morgan as the coach for next season and finally came to a conclusion and Morgan agreed to coach the Kingfisher East Bengal for the next (2012–2013) season. Kingfisher East Bengal F.C. have won the Federation Cup and Calcutta league under him but he had failed to win the I-League on his last season with East Bengal. Under his guidance the club remained unbeaten at a stretch, for a record of 30 times in a calendar year, finally getting defeated in their home ground. He gained international wideframe, defeating Tampines Rovers 2–4 in the former's home ground in Singapore on 4 March 2013. Also under his mentorship, East Bengal reached quarterfinals of 2013 AFC Cup with an unbeaten record, a feat that no other Indian club has achieved in the history of this competition.

On 9 April 2013, he announced that he will be leaving Kingfisher East Bengal as he wants to spend time with his family who reside in Perth. He said that his decision for leaving was not money.

On 23 May 2013, under his coaching Kingfisher East Bengal won the Calcutta Football League for the 34th time (3 times in a row). On the very day he announced officially that he is leaving East Bengal after 36 months of coaching. He was the most successful foreign coach of East Bengal and one of the most successful foreign coach of Indian football. He was succeeded by Marcos Falopa.

On 28 October 2015, the Hero Indian Super League team Kerala Blasters announced that he will be assuming the responsibility of Head Coach effective immediately. Peter Taylor who was the head coach of the team was replaced with mutual consent, a club press release stated at Cochin, Kerala, India. Three days later, Morgan was put back as assistant coach of the team while head of youth development, Terry Phelan would be the new head coach for the rest of the season.

On 14 April 2016, Kingfisher East Bengal F.C. announced Morgan as the club's head coach for a second time.

On 12 December 2018, FC Pune City announced Morgan as the club's assistant coach.

Philippines Football League club United City F.C. announced the signing of Morgan as its head coach on 21 August 2020. Hovewever, Morgan was unable to coach the team for its shortened 2020 season which was held in a bubble, due to the COVID-19 pandemic. Frank Muescan was named interim head coach by October 2020 to mentor the team in his stead.

== Personal life ==
Morgan is a West Ham supporter, having been born within five minutes of Upton Park. He has three grown-up children, who still live in Australia.

== Honours ==
Bolton Wanderers

- Associate Members' Cup: 1988–89

== Sources ==
- Fitzpatrick, Seán Shelbourne Cult Heroes (2009, Colour Books) ISBN 978-1-905483-67-9
