= Mridul Banerjee =

Indian football manager

Personal information
- Place of birth: Kolkata, West Bengal, India

Team information
- Current team: SC East Bengal

Managerial career
- Years: Team
- –2004: Mohammedan
- 2012: Green Valley
- 2012–2013: Mohun Bagan (Caretaker)
- 2015–2016: Mohammedan
- 2016–2017: West Bengal
- 2017: East Bengal F.C.
- 2018–2019: Delhi Dynamos (assistant coach)
- 2021: SC East Bengal (Manager cum Assistant Coach)
- 2023–: Dalhousie

Mridul Banerjee is an Indian football manager and is the current head coach of the Calcutta Premier Division side Dalhousie AC. He also earlier served as the manager of the SC East Bengal in the Indian Super League.

== Managerial career ==
=== Mohun Bagan ===
After having head coaching roles at Mohammedan, Green Valley and an assistant role at East Bengal, Banerjee signed for Mohun Bagan on 19 October 2012 as caretaker head coach of the club until 18 November 2012 when Karim Bencherifa took over as coach of the club, and Banerjee became an assistant coach.

=== Mohammedan ===
At the beginning of the 2015 season, Mridul Banerjee returned to Mohammedan Sporting Club, currently playing in the Calcutta Football League (Premier Division "A") and will also participate in the I-League 2nd Division later.

=== West Bengal football team ===
On 30 November 2016, it was announced that Banerjee would take charge of the West Bengal football team for their Santosh Trophy qualifying matches after being selected from a shortlist of other potential head coaches.

== Statistics ==
Since 28 October 2012

Team	From	To	Record				
Team	From	To	P	W	D	L	Win %
Green Valley	2012		6	1	5	0	16.67
Mohun Bagan	19 October 2012	2013	2	2	0	0	100.00
Mohammedan S C	2015	31 December 2016	7	3	3	1	42.86
Total			15	6	8	1	40.00

== Honours ==
Mohammedan Sporting

- Calcutta Football League runner-up: 2016–17

Individual

- IFA 'Amal Dutta' Trophy: 2016
