= Subrata Bhattacharya =

Indian footballer and football manager

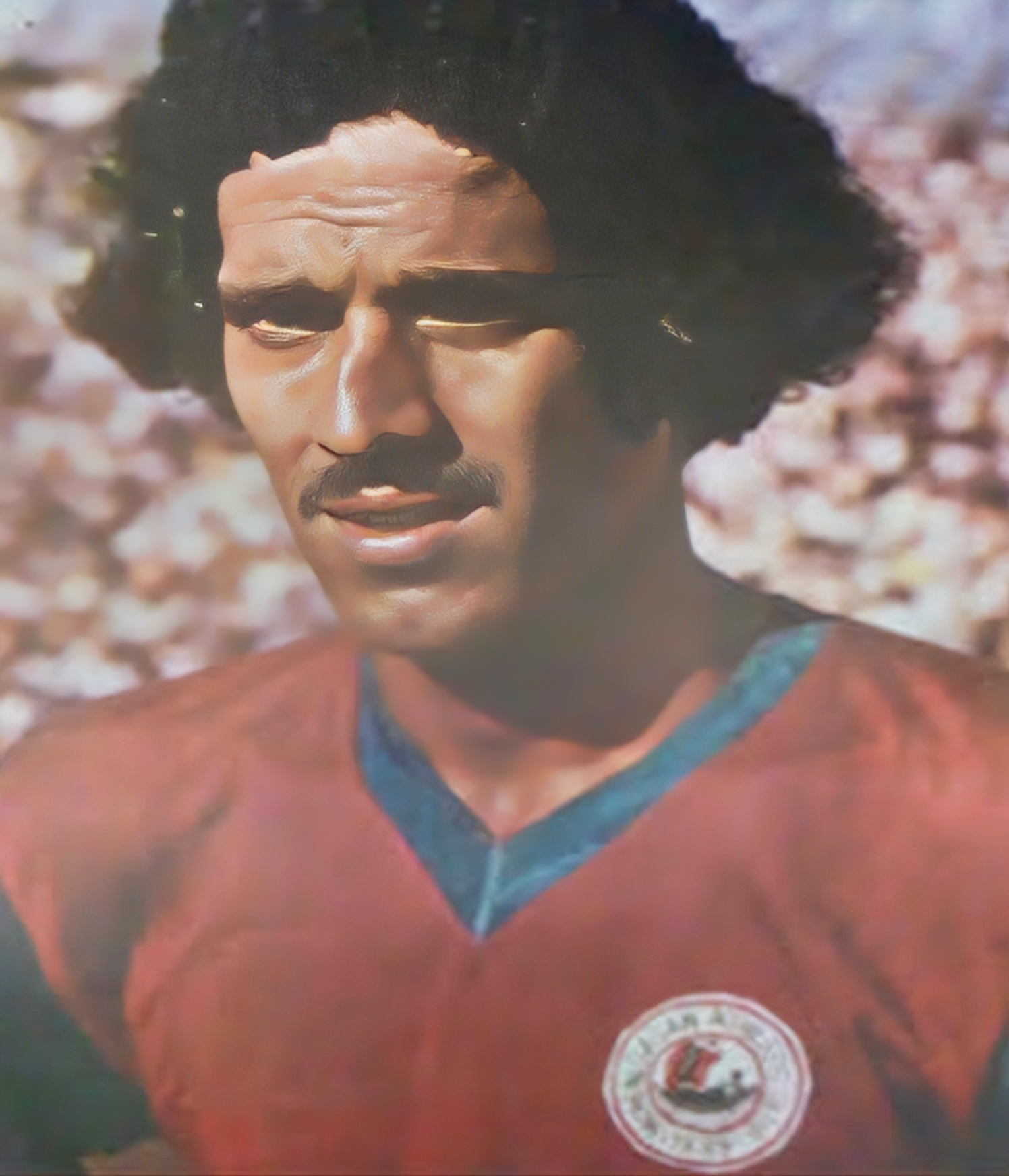
- Bhattacharya for Mohun Bagan

Personal information
- Date of birth: 3 March 1953 (age 73)
- Place of birth: Shyamnagar, West Bengal, India
- Position: Defender

Senior career*
Years	Team	Apps	(Gls)
1974–1990	Mohun Bagan	897	(67)

International career
1976–1988	India	41	(3)

Managerial career
- 2000–2003: Mohun Bagan
- 2003: Tollygunge Agragami
- 2007: East Bengal
- 2014–2018: Prayag United (technical director)
- 2018–2019: Bhawanipore
- 2019: Mohammedan (technical director)
- * Club domestic league appearances and goals

Subrata Bhattacharya (Bengali: সুব্রত ভট্টাচার্য; born 3 March 1953) is an Indian football manager and former professional footballer. He primarily played as a defender for India national team and spent seventeen years playing for Mohun Bagan. He won the Indian National Football League twice as a coach of Mohun Bagan. He was conferred with the Arjuna Award in 1989.

== Playing career ==
As a defender, influenced by players like Jarnail Singh, Bhattacharya played for seventeen years for Mohun Bagan, from 1974 to 1990. In the club, he played under coaches P. K. Banerjee and Amal Dutta. He became the Captain of Mohun Bagan in 1977; Mohun Bagan won the triple crown that season and became the first club to do so in Indian football history. He also led the side against a star-studded New York Cosmos spearheaded by Pelé on 24 September 1977; both the teams shared honours as the match ended 2–2. Under his captaincy, Mohun Bagan's performance against the American club featuring Pelé, Carlos Alberto Torres and Giorgio Chinaglia, earned popularity worldwide.

Bhattacharya as captain of P. K. Banerjee's Mohun Bagan against NY Cosmos.

With Mohun Bagan, he won numerous trophies. They won Bordoloi Trophy with win against Mohammedan Sporting, and the "triple crown", IFA Shield, Durand Cup, and Rovers Cup.

The duel between him and Chima Okorie of East Bengal was a high point of Calcutta Football League in 80s, though he believes Majid Bishkar is the greatest foreigner to have played in Kolkata.

He was a pivotal part of the state team against PSV Eindhoven and Mohun Bagan in Mohun Bagans centenary celebration against a team led by Roger Milla.

== Managerial career ==
During his coaching career, he managed all three Kolkata-giants East Bengal, Mohun Bagan and Mohammedan Sporting. He took charge of Mohun Bagan first in 2000 when the club was undergoing a period of transition, and signed few notable foreigners including Igor Shkvyrin from Uzbekistan, Sammy Omollo from Kenya, and Dusit Chalermsan from Thailand. He was sacked by the club in April 2003 after he was accused of having instigated some players of the team not to wear the Mohun Bagan jersey for the remaining two National Football League matches as they were yet to get full payment. In 2007, Bhattacharya was appointed head coach of East Bengal, but after their poor showing in the inaugural 2007–08 I-League, he resigned. He also managed then NFL side Tollygunge Agragami in 2003. He later served as both coach and technical director of Prayag United (then known as Chirag United). Bhattacharya also managed ONGC in I-League.

In 2015, Bhattacharya fought against Satyajit Chatterjee for the post of football secretary in Mohun Bagan club election and was defeated by more than 2000 votes. In May 2018, it was officially announced that Bhattacharya was appointed head coach of another Kolkata based club Bhawanipore. After unveiled new coach, he quoted "I am joining Bhawanipore instead of Tollygunge Agragami. They are offering me a better package so I decided to join them. The management has agreed that the team would practice in Kalyani instead of Kolkata. So from the first week of June, we will start preparing for the season in Kalyani." In 2019, he joined Mohammedan Sporting as technical director.

== Personal life ==
Bhattacharya is father of actor Saheb Bhattacharya, who appears in Bengali films. His daughter Sonam is married to Sunil Chhetri, who captained India, and is the country's all-time top goal scorer.

In October 2022, Bhattacharya was admitted to a city hospital after suffering from dengue. His autobiography, named Sholo Anna Bablu (lit. 'Bablu of Sixteen Annas'; "ষোলো আনা বাবলু"), was official unveiled on Mohun Bagan Day on 29 July 2023.

== Honours ==
=== As player ===
Mohun Bagan

- Federation Cup: 1978, 1980, 1981, 1982,1983, 1986, 1987
- Durand Cup: 1974, 1977, 1979, 1980, 1982, 1984, 1985, 1986
- IFA Shield: 1976, 1977, 1978, 1979, 1981, 1982, 1987, 1989
- Rovers Cup: 1976, 1977, 1981, 1985, 1988
- Calcutta Football League: 1976, 1978, 1979, 1983, 1984, 1986, 1990

Bengal

- Santosh Trophy: 1986

Individual

- Arjuna Award: 1991
- Banga Bibhushan: 2018 (by the Government of West Bengal)
- Mohun Bagan Ratna: 2017

=== As manager ===
Mohun Bagan

- National Football League: 1999–2000, 2001–02
- IFA Shield: 1999

Tollygunge Agragami

- Yamaha Libero Cup: 2003

== See also ==
- List of one-club men in association football
- List of association football families
