= McDowell's Cup =

- Organiser(s): Indian Football Association (West Bengal)
- Founded: 1995; 31 years ago
- Abolished: 2000; 26 years ago
- Region: India
- Teams: 6
- Last champions: East Bengal (3rd title)
- Most championships: East Bengal (3 titles)

McDowell's Cup (named after sponsor McDowell's of the United Breweries Group) was an Indian association football tournament held in Kolkata and organized by Indian Football Association (IFA). The tournament was first started in 1995 and was instituted as the Calcutta football season opener. It was sponsored by McDowell's No.1 Vijay Mallya's United Breweries Group. Apart from some top clubs from West Bengal, clubs from other Indian states and clubs from Bangladesh also participated in the tournament.

McDowell Cup 6th and last edition held in 2000 was won by East Bengal FC defeating rivals Mohun Bagan in the final.

== Results ==
List of McDowell's Cup Finals
Year	Winners	Score	Runners-up	Ref.
1995	East Bengal	–		
1996	Mohun Bagan	2–0	East Bengal	
1997	East Bengal	3–1	Kochin	
1998	(Bangladesh) Mukti Jodhha Krira Chakra	2nd semifinal not held		
1999	Tollygunge Agragami	1–1 (4–1 p)	East Bengal	
2000	East Bengal	1–0	Mohun Bagan	
