= Alejandro Menéndez =

Spanish football manager (born 1966)

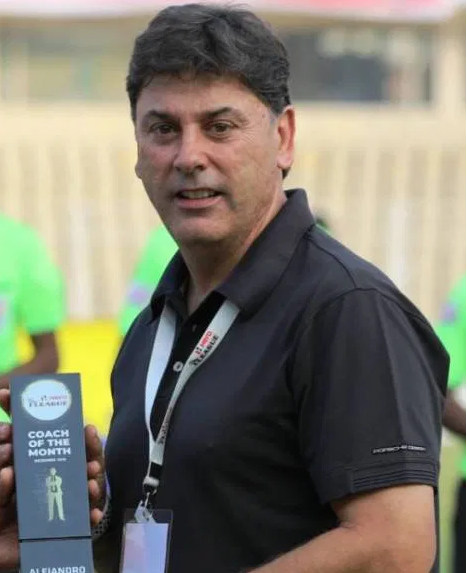
- García with the I-League Coach of the Month award in 2020

Personal information
- Full name: Alejandro Menéndez García
- Date of birth: 12 July 1966 (age 60)
- Place of birth: Gijón, Spain
- Height: 5 ft 8 in (1.73 m)
- Position: Midfielder

Youth career
- 1974–1984: Real Madrid

Senior career*
Years	Team	Apps	(Gls)
1984–2000	Sporting Gijón	538	(86)

International career
1992–1998	Spain	12	(0)

Managerial career
- 2002–2005: Sporting Gijón (youth)
- 2005–2007: Real Madrid (youth)
- 2007–2008: Celta B
- 2008: Celta
- 2008–2009: Celta B
- 2009–2011: Real Madrid B
- 2011–2013: Racing Santander
- 2013–2014: Buriram United
- 2014–2015: Shaanxi Wuzhou
- 2016–2017: Celta B
- 2017–2018: Burgos
- 2018–2020: East Bengal
- 2020–2024: Albacete
- 2025–2026: Racing Ferrol
- 2026–: Al-Madina Tripoli
- * Club domestic league appearances and goals

Alejandro Menéndez García (born 12 July 1966) is a Spanish football manager.

== Career ==
Born in Gijón, Asturias, Menéndez started his managerial career at Sporting de Gijón's youth setup. After winning the 2004 Copa de Campeones Juvenil de Fútbol and being a runner-up in the 2005 Copa del Rey Juvenil, he moved to Real Madrid as a manager of the Juvenil squad.

In July 2007, Menéndez was named Celta de Vigo B manager, with the side in Segunda División B. On 13 May 2008, he was appointed at the helm of the main squad, replacing fired Antonio Lopez, and subsequently avoided relegation with the club.

Menéndez subsequently returned to Celta's B-team and, in 2009, was appointed at another reserve team, Real Madrid Castilla also in the third tier. On 4 January 2011, he was relieved from his duties.

On 5 March 2013, Menéndez was appointed manager of Racing de Santander as a replacement for dismissed José Aurelio Gay. However, he could not avoid the club's relegation to the third level, and subsequently left the club.

In September 2013 Menéndez moved abroad for the first time in his career, being named Buriram United F.C. manager in Thailand. With the side, he achieved immediate success, winning a domestic treble (Thai Premier League, Thai FA Cup and Thai League Cup) during his first season in charge.

Menéndez resigned on 11 April 2014, after winning the Toyota Premier Cup and the Kor Royal Cup. On 28 December of that year, he was named as the new manager of China League One side Shaanxi Wuzhou, but left the side one month later due to bureaucratic problems.

One year since his last job, Menéndez returned to Celta B in February 2016, where he signed a one-and-a-half-year contract as a replacement for the sacked Javier Torres Gomez.

In August 2018, Menendez joined East Bengal F.C. of India's I-League for the upcoming season, as part of a spending spree by new owners Quess Corp. He led the club to second place, one point behind Chennai City FC, and won both Kolkata Derby matches against Mohun Bagan A.C. at the end of the campaign in March 2019 he extended his link by two years. He resigned on 21 January 2020, after taking just eight points from the first seven games of the season.

Menéndez returned to his home country on 8 December 2020, after being appointed Albacete Balompié's third manager of the season. Unable to take the club out of the relegation zone, he was sacked the following 4 May.

On 22 January 2025, after nearly four years without a club, Menéndez was named manager of Racing de Ferrol in the second division. He left on 3 June, after suffering relegation.

== Managerial statistics ==
As of 3 June 2025

Managerial record by team and tenure
Team	Nat.	From	To	Record								Ref.
Team	Nat.	From	To	G	W	D	L	GF	GA	GD	Win %	Ref.
Celta B	(Spain)	1 July 2007	13 May 2008	37	15	8	14	55	50	+5	40.54	
Celta	(Spain)	13 May 2008	30 June 2008	5	1	2	2	11	11	+0	20.00	
Celta B	(Spain)	30 June 2008	1 July 2009	38	15	13	10	42	26	+16	39.47	
Real Madrid Castilla	(Spain)	1 July 2009	4 January 2011	57	22	14	21	89	75	+14	38.60	
Racing Santander	(Spain)	5 March 2013	30 June 2013	14	5	4	5	16	13	+3	35.71	
Buriram United	(Thailand)	8 September 2013	11 April 2014	28	15	8	5	46	30	+16	53.57	
Shaanxi Wuzhou	(China)	28 December 2014	31 January 2015	0	0	0	0	0	0	+0	—	
Celta B	(Spain)	2 February 2016	30 May 2017	55	35	8	12	101	50	+51	63.64	
Burgos	(Spain)	19 February 2018	6 June 2018	12	3	4	5	10	14	−4	25.00	
East Bengal	(India)	20 August 2018	21 January 2020	49	28	8	13	87	54	+33	57.14	
Albacete	(Spain)	8 December 2020	4 May 2021	21	6	4	11	15	25	−10	28.57	
Racing Ferrol	(Spain)	22 January 2025	3 June 2025	19	3	2	14	8	30	−22	15.79	
Al-Madina Tripoli	(Libya)	11 June 2026	Present									
Career Total				335	148	75	112	480	378	+102	44.18	

== Honours ==
Buriram United

- Thai Premier League: 2013
- Thai FA Cup: 2013
- Thai League Cup: 2013
- Kor Royal Cup: 2014
- Toyota Premier Cup: 2014

=== Individual awards ===
- I-League Coach of the Month (December 2019)
