= Manolo Díaz =

Spanish footballer & manager (born 1968)

Personal information
- Full name: José Manuel Díaz Fernández
- Date of birth: 30 August 1968 (age 58)
- Place of birth: Madrid, Spain
- Position: Forward

Youth career
- Real Madrid

Senior career*
Years	Team	Apps	(Gls)
1988–1991	Alcalá	102	(15)
1991–1992	Getafe	3	(0)
1994–1995	Aranjuez	1	(0)
Total		106	(15)

Managerial career
- 2002–2006: Real Madrid (youth)
- 2008–2009: Navalcarnero
- 2009–2013: Real Madrid C
- 2013–2014: Real Madrid B
- 2014–2016: Ponferradina
- 2018–2019: Real Madrid B
- 2021: Hércules
- 2021: East Bengal
- * Club domestic league appearances and goals

José Manuel 'Manolo' Díaz Fernández (born 30 August 1968) is a Spanish professional football manager and former player who played as a forward.

== Coaching career ==
Born in Madrid, Díaz began his managerial career at the Juvenil squad of Real Madrid, leaving the club in 2006 after the arrival of the new president Ramón Calderón. He returned to Spain following a brief spell in Mexico, being appointed at CDA Navalcarnero in summer 2008.

Díaz was named coach of Real Madrid C a year later, after Florentino Pérez's return as president. In 2011–12 he led the team to second place in the regular season, and despite losing in the playoffs, saw them achieve promotion to Segunda División B due to administrative relegations.

On 19 November 2013, Díaz replaced the fired Alberto Toril at the helm of the B side. His first match in charge was four days later, a 0–0 home draw against CD Numancia. Later that year, he finally took the reserves from the bottom position in Segunda División, having won 13 out of a possible 15 points and four consecutive wins.

In July 2014, Díaz was appointed at SD Ponferradina in the second division. On 31 January 2016, after the sixth loss in seven matches, he was dismissed; the campaign eventually ended in relegation.

Díaz returned to the Santiago Bernabéu Stadium on 24 June 2017, being appointed youth system coordinator. In late October 2018, as Santiago Solari was named Julen Lopetegui's successor in the first team, he replaced the former at Castilla.

On 8 September 2021, following a short stint in the Spanish third tier with Hércules CF, Díaz was announced as head coach of Indian Super League side East Bengal FC. He resigned at the end of the year due to a poor start to the season.

== Managerial statistics ==
As of 23 December 2021

Managerial record by team and tenure
Team	From	To	Record								Ref
Team	From	To	G	W	D	L	GF	GA	GD	Win %	Ref
Navalcarnero	30 June 2008	17 February 2009	25	7	4	14	24	37	−13	28.00	
Real Madrid C	22 July 2009	19 November 2013	172	78	45	49	273	184	+89	45.35	
Real Madrid B	19 November 2013	25 June 2014	28	11	9	8	42	33	+9	39.29	
Ponferradina	3 July 2014	31 January 2016	70	26	17	27	85	85	+0	37.14	
Real Madrid B	29 October 2018	20 June 2019	30	14	7	9	49	40	+9	46.67	
Hércules	8 February 2021	1 July 2021	13	5	3	5	17	15	+2	38.46	
East Bengal	8 September 2021	28 December 2021	8	0	4	4	10	18	−8	0.00	
Total			346	141	89	116	500	412	+88	40.75	—
