= Amal Dutta =

Indian footballer and coach

Personal information
- Full name: Amal Dutta
- Date of birth: 10 January 1930
- Place of birth: Jorasanko, Calcutta, Bengal, British India
- Date of death: 10 July 2016 (aged 86)
- Place of death: Baguiati, Kolkata, West Bengal, India
- Position: Midfielder

Senior career*
Years	Team	Apps	(Gls)
- Friends Club
- Subarnon
- Sporting Union
- Bengal Nagpur Railway
- Aryans
1953–1956	East Bengal		
- Mohun Bagan

International career
1953–1954	India	1	(0)

Managerial career
- 1960: Bengal
- 1960–1962: Aryan
- 1963–1965: East Bengal
- 1967–1968: Orissa
- 1969–1971: Mohun Bagan
- 1976–1985: East Bengal
- 1980–1981: Orissa
- 1985–1987: Mohun Bagan
- 1987: India
- 1989–2006: Mohun Bagan
- 2006–2007: Chirag United
- * Club domestic league appearances and goals

Amal Dutta (Bengali: অমল দত্ত; 4 May 1930 – 10 July 2016) was a former Indian footballer, coach and football manager. Born in Calcutta, then Bengal Presidency, he is considered as the first professional football coach in the country. A finest thinker of the sport, Dutta had a rivalry with Pradip Kumar Banerjee during his coaching days in Kolkata club football.

Known for introducing the "diamond system" in football in India in the late 1970s, Dutta is known as "Diamond Coach".

== Playing career ==
=== Earlier career ===
Dutta began his playing career in Friends Club of Jorasanko. He then went on to play for numerous clubs of lower divisions, Subarnon, Sporting Union, Aryans and Bengal Nagpur Railway respectively.

=== East Bengal and Mohun Bagan ===
Dutta made his full-time professional club football debut in the CFL, in early 1950s, appeared with East Bengal in three consecutive seasons from 1953 to 1956. During his playing days with both East Bengal and India, he played under two of the India's coaches, Bagha Som and Syed Abdul Rahim. In his first season with the club, he was part of the team that toured Romania and participated in World Youth Festival, and Soviet Union in 1953. In that year, the club played against German side Kickers Offenbach and Soviet team Torpedo Moscow.

He also played for Mohun Bagan, arch-rival of East Bengal, for a short period of time and represented the club in Rovers Cup.

=== International career ===
On 25 October 1953, Dutta made his national team debut against Pakistan in Rangoon during the Asian Quadrangular Football Tournament, which was his only appearance for India. Managed by Balaidas Chatterjee, they won the tournament. He was also a member of Indian squad in the 1954 Asian Games in Manila.

Dutta also appeared with the Indian team against numerous visiting European teams in exhibition matches, including a 1–0 defeat to Allsvenskan club AIK at CC&FC Ground in Kolkata on 10 December 1954.

== Coaching career ==
Dutta hanged-up his boots after his playing career cut short due to injury at the age of 29. Soon in the early 1960s, he left his job in the Indian Railways to become a full-time coach. He then went to England for a one-year FA coaching course paid for from his own finances, where he was taught by renowned football administrator Walter Winterbottom, who was first manager of England. Dutta was influenced by Indian coach Sir Dukhiram Majumder.

After returning to India, Dutta started a coaching camp in Bally, Howrah. His first major assignment was to coach Railways in 1960 for the Santosh Trophy, and later managed Odisha twice in the same tournament. Dutta later managed Calcutta Football League club Aryan from 1960 to 1962 and guided players like Asim Moulick. His first assignment with a big club was in 1963 with East Bengal midway through the Calcutta Football League. His first Kolkata Derby match against Mohun Bagan ended in a 3–0 defeat in CFL, and in the return leg, East Bengal bounced back and clinched a 2–0 victory. He remained as coach of East Bengal in 1964 but a year later, after gaining coaching course abroad, the first-ever in India and a feat for which, he received little recognition.

I am known as a Harley Street specialist. When the patient (losing football club) has been treated by all doctors and not recovered, they come to me.

— Dutta on his coaching days, in an interview with Novy Kapadia.

Leaving his job from the Indian Railways to become a full-time coach, was a bold step in the then amateur football scene of the country and it is the reason behind his nickname, the 'first professional coach of India'. In his long coaching career he was associated with premier football clubs of India, and also became coach of India. Dutta coached all the three big clubs of the Kolkata Maidan. With East Bengal; he won the CFL (twice), IFA shield (twice), Rovers Cup, Durand Cup, Darjeeling Gold Cup, Bordoloi Trophy, Airlines Gold Cup, Sanjay Gandhi Gold Cup and ATP Shield. He had more success with Mohun Bagan whom he coached to 4 Calcutta Football League titles, 4 IFA Shield titles, 3 Federation Cups, 2 Durand Cups and also wins in DCM Trophy, All Airlines Gold Cup, Sikkim Governor's Gold Cup and Nehru Trophy. In a single season with Mohammedan Sporting in 1980, Dutta won Rovers, DCM and Sikkim Governors Gold Cup titles.

With Mohun Bagan, Dutta won multiple trophies including a "double" in 1969 (IFA Shield and Calcutta Football League). He guided the team clinching Rovers Cup consecutively from 1970 to 1972 while players like Bhabani Roy were flourished under his tenure. After managing the mariners in 1969–1971 and 1985–1987, Dutta returned to the club again in 1989. He then utilized an innovative 3–4–3 "Diamond System", with Abdul Khaliq and Okerie in the front, the club played offensively, which was rare in Indian football. At the 1997 Federation Cup, one of the most anticipated matches in Indian football history, Dutta managed the club against Banerjee's East Bengal in front of the recorded 131,000+ spectators at the Vivekananda Yuba Bharati Krirangan. Despite a 4–1 defeat, fans lauded Mohun Bagan's impressive style of play under his "Diamond System".

Dutta has also managed another Kolkata-based NFL side Tollygunge Agragami from 1999 to 2000. He helped the team reaching final of the 105th edition of IFA Shield in November 1999. Tollygunge also played in the Calcutta Football League under his short spell of coaching. In September 2006, Dutta was roped in as head coach of Chirag United in place of Belgian manager Philippe De Ridder. Dutta also managed teams like BNR, Titanium SC, Bhatri Sangha. He managed noted Indian club Dempo in 1981–82 and helped the team clinching Goa Senior Division League title in 1981. In his coaching career, he managed the India national football team and helped them clinching gold at the 1987 South Asian Games, held in Pakistan. In 1967–68, and 1980–81, he managed Odisha in Santosh Trophy, and also worked as technical director of India while Syed Nayeemuddin was head coach. He also managed another Kolkata-giant Mohammedan Sporting. A rough and tough behavior coach in local and national level teams, and highly controversial character on and off the pitch, Dutta is known as the first Indian professional coach, who gave Bengali youngsters their first taste of world football by showing them video clippings of famous Brazilian players of that time.

== Tactics ==
Dutta was renowned for his bold and innovative tactics and formation, Diamond system. Popularly known as the "Diamond Coach" of Indian football for utilising the 3–4–3 diamond formation, he was one of the key figures who shaped the Kolkata Derby rivalry between Mohun Bagan and East Bengal. Dutta is India's first ever licensed coach, who is credited to have employed modern methods in domestic football, before those became popular in the country.

Amal Dutta's 4–2–4 line-up for Mohun Bagan against East Bengal at the 1969 IFA Shield final.

During his early days with the "red and gold brigade" as head coach, he felt that 2–3–5 formation is outdated and wanted to try a three-man defence influenced by the Soviet Union. His proposal to acquire the three-man defence tactic was denied by then East Bengal manager Jyotish Chandra Guha. He brought the iconic Brazilian 4–2–4 system in Mohun Bagan despite opposition from club legends including Sailen Manna, and later used the bold 3–4–3 formation. As chief coach of India, Dutta introduced the 4–4–2 formation at the Football at the 1987 South Asian Games, in which they won gold defeating Nepal. The 3–4–3 diamond formation was popularly used by Johan Cruyff's FC Barcelona. Being a stickler for discipline, Dutta revolutionized football in Kolkata.

== Personal life ==
Dutta was born in Calcutta, brought up in Shikdarpara Lane. Noted Bengali poet and writer Akshay Kumar Baral was his maternal grandfather. In his earlier days, Dutta learnt Tabla playing from Radheshyam Dutta. He was married to Arati Dutta. The 1946 riots in Bengal changed Dutta's life for a while. In his working career before entering into coaching, Dutta was employed in both Bengal Nagpur Railway and Income Tax Department of India. He also worked in Rifle Factory Ishapore, also coached the institution's football team.

He is author of several books including Football Khelte Hole (lit. 'If You Play Football'), and his autobiography Jotodin Bnachi (lit. 'So Long As I Am Alive'). Dutta died on 10 July 2016 at the age of 86.

== Legacy ==
In July 2016, Utpal Ganguly, president of Indian Football Association, announced that the best coach of every Calcutta Football League season will be awarded with Amal Dutta Trophy, as IFA's tribute to Amal Dutta.

A multipurpose stadium named "Amal Dutta Krirangan" in Dum Dum, North 24 Parganas, was built in honour of Dutta, which was inaugurated by sports and PWD minister Aroop Biswas in March 2020. The stadium also hosts matches of Calcutta Football League.

== Honours ==
=== Player ===
India

- Asian Quadrangular Football Tournament: 1953

East Bengal

- Durand Cup: 1956
- P. K. Nair Gold Cup: 1956

=== Manager ===
East Bengal

- IFA Shield: 1965, 1976, 1981, 1983, 1984
- Federation Cup: 1978, 1980
- Durand Cup: 1978, 1982
- Calcutta Football League: 1977, 1982, 1985
- Rovers Cup: 1980
- DCM Trophy: 1983
- Bordoloi Trophy: 1978
- Darjeeling Gold Cup: 1976, 1981, 1982, 1985
- Stafford Cup: 1981
- Sanjay Gandhi Gold Cup: 1984
- Trades Cup: 1976
- William Younger Cup: 1976

Mohun Bagan

- IFA Shield: 1969
- Rovers Cup: 1970, 1971, 1972, 1985
- Federation Cup: 1986, 1987
- Durand Cup: 1985, 1986
- Calcutta Football League: 1986

Dempo

- Goa Senior Division League: 1981

India

- South Asian Games Gold medal: 1987

Tollygunge Agragami

- IFA Shield runner-up: 1999
- McDowell's Cup: 1999

Chirag United

- Trades Cup: 2007; runner-up: 2006

Individual

- East Bengal "Lifetime Achievement Award": 2014
- Sportskeeda Coach of the All time Indian Football XI

== See also ==
- India national football team at the Olympics
- Football at the Asian Games
- List of East Bengal Club coaches
- List of India national football team managers
