= Bikash Panji =

Indian footballer

Personal information
- Place of birth: West Bengal, India
- Position: Midfielder

Senior career*
Years	Team	Apps	(Gls)
- Mohun Bagan
1985–1992	East Bengal Club		(65)
1994	East Bengal Club		(1)

International career
- India
- * Club domestic league appearances and goals

Bikash Panji is a retired Indian professional football midfielder who represented the India national team and appeared with both the Kolkata-giants East Bengal and Mohun Bagan.

== Playing career ==
Panji represented India at the 1984 Asian Cup. He also played club football for Mohun Bagan and East Bengal. He scored two goals (both against Bangladesh) during the 1986 World Cup Qualification, as India finished second with 7 points. He has scored 66 goals for East Bengal Club, and captained the team in 1988–89. In East Bengal, he had a lethal combination with Krishanu Dey in the 1980s.

Panji made his debut in Santosh Trophy for the Railways team that finished second in 1982. After moving to Mohun Bagan the next year, he represented Bengal thereafter.

== See also ==
- List of India national football team captains
