= All Airlines Gold Cup =

Association football club tournament

- Organiser(s): Indian Football Association
- Founded: 1986; 40 years ago
- Abolished: 2012; 14 years ago
- Region: India
- Last champions: Mohun Bagan (8th title)
- Most championships: Mohun Bagan (8 titles)

The All Airlines Gold Cup was a domestic football tournament organised by the Indian Football Association. It was launched in 1986 and Mohammedan Sporting won the inaugural edition beating Mohun Bagan 3–2. All Airlines Gold Cup was introduced by the All Airlines Recreation Club.

The 2012 All Airlines Gold Cup was won by Mohun Bagan.

== Results ==
Year	Host	Final		
Year	Host	Winner	Score	Runner-up
1986	Calcutta	Mohammedan Sporting	3–2	Mohun Bagan
1987	Calcutta	East Bengal	1–0	Mohammedan Sporting
1988	Calcutta	East Bengal	4–1	Mohammedan Sporting
1989	Calcutta	Mohun Bagan	2–1	Mohammedan Sporting
1990	Calcutta	East Bengal	1–0	Mohammedan Sporting
1991	Calcutta	Mohun Bagan	2–0	Tata Football Academy
1992	Calcutta	East Bengal	1–0	Mohun Bagan
1993	Calcutta	Mohun Bagan	7–6 (p)	East Bengal
1994	Calcutta	Border Security Force	1–0	East Bengal
1995	Calcutta	East Bengal	2–0	Mohun Bagan
1996	Calcutta	Mohammedan Sporting	3–2 (p)	Peerless
1997	Siliguri	Border Security Force	2–1	Mohun Bagan
1998	Midnapore	East Bengal	4–3 (p)	Aryan
1998/99	Calcutta	Border Security Force	2–0	Tollygunge Agragami
1999	Haldia	(Bangladesh) Mohammedan (Dhaka)	1–1 (a.e.t.) (3–2 p)	East Bengal
2000	Calcutta	Mohun Bagan	2–0	Tollygunge Agragami
2001	Coochbehar	East Bengal	2–0	All-Nepal FA XI
2002	Barasat	Mohun Bagan	3–1	Tollygunge Agragami
2003	Haldia	Eveready Association	2–1	Mohun Bagan
2004	Durgapur/Burnpur	Mohun Bagan	3–0	George Telegraph
2005	Burnpur	Mohun Bagan	1–0	Mohammedan Sporting
2010	Durgapur	Mohammedan Sporting	1–1 (a.e.t.) (4–3 p)	Aryan
2011	Kolkata	Kalighat Milan Sangha	3–2	Mohammedan Sporting
2012	Kolkata	Mohun Bagan		Mohammedan Sporting

== Top three winners ==
Titles	Winners	Year
8	Mohun Bagan	1989, 1991, 1993, 2000, 2002, 2004, 2005, 2012.
7	East Bengal	1987, 1988, 1990, 1992, 1995, 1998, 2001.
3	Border Security Force	1994, 1997, 1998/99.
3	Mohammedan Sporting	1986, 1996, 2010.
