= History of Mohun Bagan Super Giant =

Indian football club history

Mohun Bagan Super Giant, the legal footballing entity of Mohun Bagan Athletic Club, is one of the oldest football clubs in India.

== Early years ==
Mohun Bagan was established on 15 August 1889, with Bhupendra Nath Bose becoming the first president of the newly founded club and Jyotindra Nath Bose the first secretary of it. Mohun Bagan played their first match in 1889 against the team of Eden Hindu Hostel students and lost 1–0. The initial players to play for the club were Girin Basu, Pramatha Nath Chattopadhyay, Sachin Bandhyopadhyay, Ram Goswami, Sarat Mitra, Hem Nath Sen, Nalin Basu, Upen Ghosh, Manindra Nath Basu, Manomoham Pandey, Probhas Mitra, and the captain Manilal Sen. The first tournament that the club participated in was the 1893 Coochbehar Cup, where the team suffered to perform against the British Indian Army teams and the clubs like Aryan, National, Town Club, Kumurtuli, Fort William's Arsenal and the famed Sovabazar, which was founded by the Father of Indian football Nagendra Prasad Sarbadhikari himself.

== Late colonial era ==
The early exits from major tournaments suffered in the 1900s evoked ridicule from its local rivals, including Sovabazar. Soon after the appointment of Subedar-major Sailen Basu as the secretary, the club adopted European playing methods and players underwent rigorous physical training and followed austere fitness regime similar to that in the army. The club also began recruiting players from other clubs, especially from National, where footballers played in boots rather than barefoot. Rev. Sudhir Chatterjee was one of the notable recruitments from National, who was also the only player in the club to play in boots at that time. As a result, the club achieved its first success by winning the 1904 Coochbehar Cup.

The following year Mohun Bagan won the Coochbehar Cup once again and reached the Gladstone Cup final, held in Chinsurah, where they defeated the reigning IFA Shield champions Dalhousie 6–1, with Shibdas Bhaduri scoring four goals. Maharaja Rajendra Bhup Bahadur of Coochbehar, impressed by the team, would become a chief patron of the club. In 1906, Mohun Bagan also won the Minto Fort Tournament by defeating one of the major English clubs in India, Calcutta. But they were disqualified for the 1906 IFA Shield because P.K. Biswas, who had played for both National and Mohun Bagan in the same year, which was considered illegal by the Indian Football Association, the then de facto governing body of Indian football.

Apart from team building, Subedar-major Basu had a remarkable contribution in arranging a new club tent and ground after the demolition of Mohun Bagan Villa in 1891. The club did not have a permanent club tent, but the number of club members increased due to minimal membership fees of at most 8 annas. During this period a major meeting was held among the club officials including Jyotindra Nath Basu, Subedar-major Sailen Basu, Dwijendra Nath Basu, Sir Bhupendra Nath Mitra and Dr. Girish Ghosh and soon the club tent within Mohun Bagan's premises in Maidan was constructed. Mohun Bagan won the Trades Cup four consecutive times between 1906 and 1909, which was the second most prestigious tournament in India after IFA Shield. Mohun Bagan won Coochbehar Cup in 1907 and 1908, and then both the Laxmibilas Cup and the Gladstone Cup in 1909 and 1910. In 1909 and 1910, among only a few other native clubs, the team had the honor to play in the IFA Shield for its consistent performances over the recent years. However, they would struggle to match the regimental teams of British and British Indian armies in the first two years of participation.

=== The historic year of 1911 ===
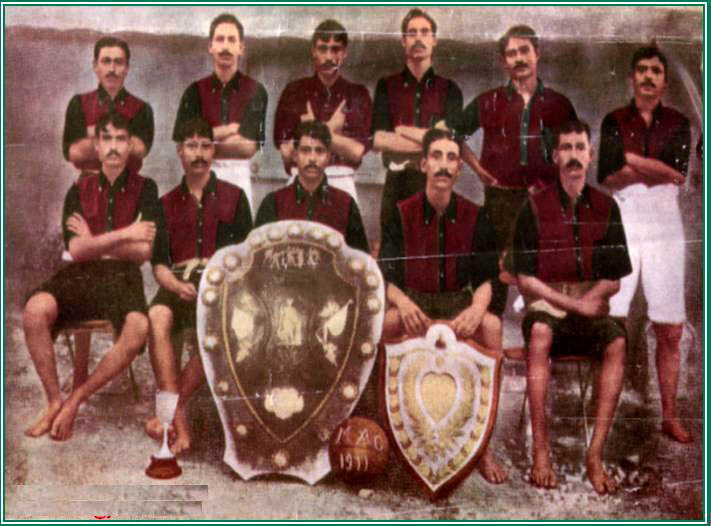
A colourized image of the IFA Shield winning team of 1911

In 1911, Mohun Bagan formed a dominant side for the IFA Shield, which included Hiralal Mukherjee, Bhuti Sukul, Rev. Sudhir Chatterjee, Monmohun Mukherjee, Rajen Sengupta, Nil Madhav Bhattacharya, Kanu Roy, Habul Sarkar, Abhilash Ghosh, Bijoydas Bhaduri and captained by Shibdas Bhaduri. They battled out against the professionally equipped teams of St. Xavier's College, Calcutta Rangers Club, Rifle Brigade and Middlesex Regiment to reach the IFA Shield final without conceding a goal. The enthusiasm for the final on 29 July 1911 was such that people came from other districts of Bengal as well as from neighboring provinces of Bihar and Assam. The East Indian Railway Company ran a special train and additional steamer services were pressed into service to ferry spectators to Calcutta from the mofussil areas. Tickets for the match, originally priced at ₹1 and ₹2, were sold at ₹15 due to its immense demand in the region. After trailing by a goal from Sgt. Jackson of East Yorkshire Regiment team within the first 15 minutes of the 50 minute-match, Shibdas Bhaduri soon scored an equalizer in the first half and then set up Abhilash Ghosh to score the winner with just two minutes remaining. The club became the first native team to lift the IFA Shield, that too in front of an estimated crowd of 80,000, although the referee, H.G. Pooler, estimated approximately 20,000 to be the number. Mohun Bagan supporters and the public at large went berserk, even supporters of Muslim representative clubs like Moslem and Mohammedan went to the streets to celebrate and the Muslims from Dharmatala joined the victory procession of Hindus near the Thanthania Kalibari.

"For the first time in the history of Indian football an Indian team, the Mohun Bagan, consisting purely of Bengalees, has won the Indian Football Association Shield beating crack teams of English regiments. About 80,000 spectators were present on the ground, but most of them could not see the match. By noticing the flying of kites, they were following the actions of the match. And when they came to know about the win of their team, they started tearing off their shirts, waving them, tearing their hairs."

— Reuters, cablegram to English newspapers

"What the Congress failed to achieve, Mohun Bagan has. In other words, they have succeeded in degrading the English."

— The Englishman, July 31st, 1911 publication

"The team comprising of the Bengalis won the IFA Shield by defeating three top military teams. 80,000 Indians will remain witnesses to this event. There is nothing to be surprised at. The team that is physically more fit, has sharp surveillance and intelligence, wins."

— Manchester Guardian

"The Japanese victory over the Russians did not stir the East half as much as did the match between Mohun Bagan and East York."

— India Mirror, July 30th, 1911 publication

"Mohun Bagan is not a football team. It is a tortured country, rolling in the dust, which has just started to raise its head."

— Achintya Kumar Sengupta, Kallol Jug

Based on a popular legend, after the match ended, a Brahmin, pointing to the Union Jack fluttering atop Fort William, asked Rev. Chatterjee, "When will that come down?" and was predicted that the flag would come down only when Mohun Bagan wins the shield next time, which coincidentally came true.

=== Nation-wide exposure of the club (1912–30) ===
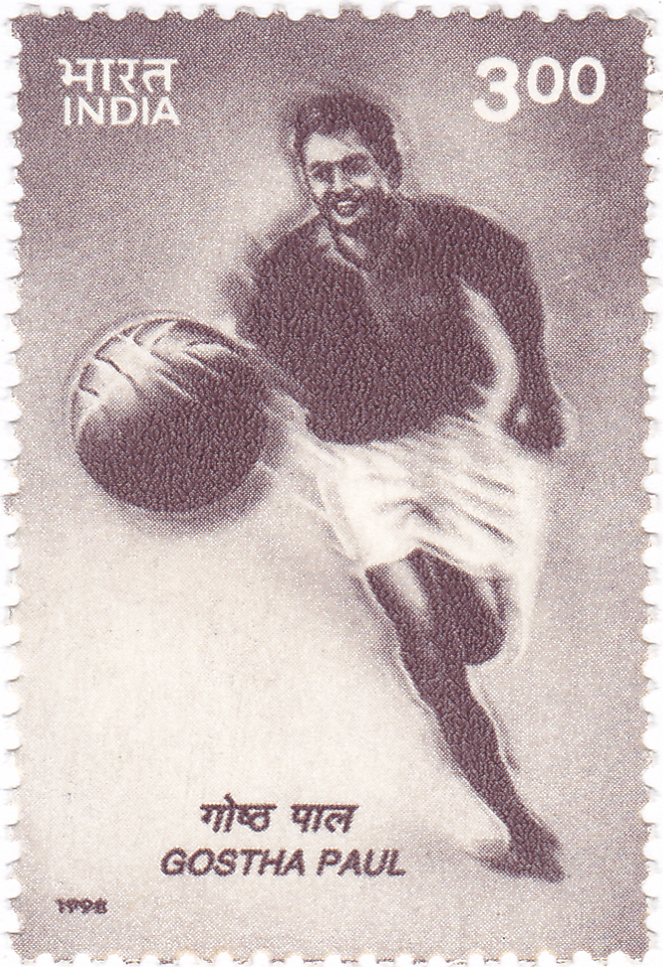
Gostha Pal featuring on 1998 stamp of India

After a comparatively disappointing year in 1912, Shibdas Bhaduri handed the captaincy to Habul Sarkar the following year, but they failed to win any trophy that year. The same year Gostha Pal joined the club as a defender at the young age of 16 and soon became known as the "Chinese Wall" for his defensive prowess. In 1914, Mohun Bagan for the first time played in CFL 2nd Division and finished third, but got promoted after a team from the 1st Division withdrew. Mohun Bagan played their first match on 15 May 1915 against Calcutta, which was drawn. Meanwhile, Subedar-major Basu had to leave for his commitments in the military service for the World War I and Dwijendra Nath Basu, nephew of Bhupendra Nath Basu and brother of Subedar-major Basu, replaced him as the club's secretary. Mohun Bagan finished fourth in their league debut, while a separate team of the club made to the semi-finals of the Trades Cup and Coochbehar Cup. The next year, Mohun Bagan reached the second position in the league and the following year, narrowly lost the IFA Shield final to Middlesex Regiment.

On 8 August 1921, the club played its first match against East Bengal in the Coochbehar Cup semi-final, which ended in a goalless draw, but Mohun Bagn went on to beat them in the replay by 3–0 and gave rise to the Kolkata Derby. In 1922, Mohun Bagan played exhibition matches of football and cricket against a team of Indians from South Africa. The following year, Mohun Bagan was invited to Rovers Cup in Bombay, where they lost to Durham Light Infantry by 4–1. After 35 years of long association of Bhupendra Nath Basu with Mohun Bagan came to an end with his demise in 1924, and was succeeded by Sir Rajendranath Mukherjee. The next year, Mohun Bagan became the first civilian Indian team to be invited to the oldest football tournament in Asia, Durand Cup, where they lost to Sherwood Foresters in the semi-finals. That year Mohun Bagan also failed to win the league and finished second. During this period, the club attended as well as hosted numerous charity-matches all over the country for fundraising as the earnings from memberships were not enough to run the club over a long period. On 28 May 1925, the club played its first official derby and lost by 1–0. In 1929, due to a clash during the match of Mohun Bagan and Dalhousie, all the native teams withdrew their names from the IFA registration, until it was negotiated on the condition that there would be equal number of European and Indian teams in the association.

=== Significant contributions to the national team (1931–47) ===
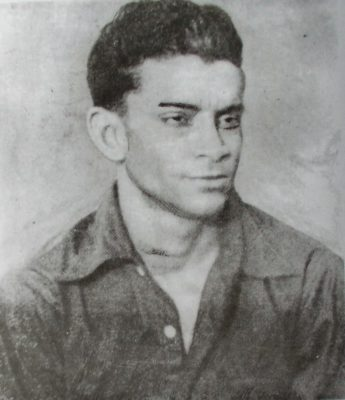
Karuna Bhattacharya, a long-time associate of Mohun Bagan as a player and later as secretary and coach of the team.

Renowned barrister Shailendra Nath Banerjee became the secretary of the club with the turn of the decade. In 1931 the club acquired the services of highly skilled players like, Karuna 'Habla' Bhattacharya and Syed Abdus Samad. In 1933, Gostho Pal, who lead the club for 5 years from 1921, got selected as the captain of IFA XI representing India for an away match against Ceylon, but the following year, due to injury, his partner in defence Dr. Sanmatha Dutta led the tour to South Africa for a series of matches. 1935 saw a great change in Mohun Bagan's tradition of playing with bare-feet when on the behest of Abdul Hamid, a renowned player from Quetta, the club decided to use boots mandatorily for the first time. In 1937, Mohun Bagan originally faced off against a foreign team – an English amateur club Islington Corinthians, who were on a world tour; but narrowly lost by 1–0. In 1938 the tradition of Mohun Bagan players leading IFA teams continued with Karuna Bhattacharya captaining a side to Australia, where he also scored against Australia as well as Football Queensland team during the tour. In the late-1930s both Umapati Kumar and Gostha Pal retired, but the squad got competent reinforcements – Anil Dey in half back position and Satyen 'Mana' Guin in attack, who a right winger was nicknamed "Racing Deer" for his speed along the flanks. Mohun Bagan also broke a 29-year-old barren run in Trades Cup, in 1938. Captained by Bimal Mukherjee, Mohun Bagan broke their long wait for a major trophy in 1939 when they won their first ever Calcutta Football League title. Significantly, Mohun Bagan also celebrated its golden jubilee the same year, which was marked with celebrations across the city, match organized featuring renowned former players and, medals and jerseys were distributed to the players. From 1933 to 1939 the club won 29 trophies, also out of 23 derbies, was victorious 12 times, including 1 walkover win, drew 10 matches and lost only once.

In 1941, the secretaryship was given to another famed barrister, B.C. Ghosh replacing Sailen Banerjee, who was elected as the club's vice-president, and the following year insurance policies were incepted for the medical aid of the injured players during matches, and a medical board composed of reputed doctors was formed to oversee the medical issues. A trust board was also formed on the initiative of a solicitor B.K.Ghosh and a barrister Dr. S.K.Gupta for the monetary support of the club. In 1943 and 1944, Mohun Bagan won CFL in succession. In 1944, Secretary Ghosh became the club's vice-president, and Dr. Gupta took charge of the general secretary's office. Meanwhile, a junior football team was formed under the guidance of a former Mohun Bagan player, Balaidas Chattopadhyay, and also efforts were taken to introduce sports like rugby and baseball among the youth. In 1945, George Curtis, who was an Arsenal player stationed in India as a part of Royal Air Force in the World War II, took charge of the team on request as a mentor for a brief stint.

== Following independence ==
Mohun Bagan won its second IFA Shield on 15 November by defeating its arch-rival East Bengal in the year of India's independence, as foretold in 1911, becoming the first club to win the Shield in post-independent India.

=== Struggle with consistency (1948–1950s) ===
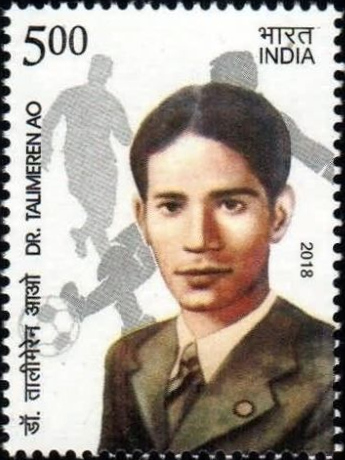
Dr. Talimeren Ao featuring on the 2018 postage stamp of India

In the first year after the independence the club handed the captaincy for two years to Talimeren Ao, who had been a part of the club since 1943 after leaving Maharana Club in Guwahati. Ao went on to lead the national team in 1948 Summer Olympics in London, along with teammates Mahabir Prasad and Sailen Manna. The club's secretary, Balai Das Chattopadhyay too had to leave for London as the team's head coach and trainer, while Gostho Pal filled in for his duties in the club. Anil Dey was called for the national team as well but stayed behind, and Dhanadaranjan 'Bokai' Sen carried out the captain's duties in the absence of Ao. In the same year, the Afghan monarch invited Mohun Bagan on the occasion of their independence celebrations but the club could not attend because of its preplanned agenda. That year, Mohun Bagan successfully defended the IFA Shield against Bhawanipore in the final. Ao's on-field excellences for the club and country caught the eyes of Arsenal and was offered a one-year contract but was turned down by him to later pursue MBBS.

"I am proud and delighted that, fortunately, I have witnessed the IFA Shield tournament of 1911. During the freedom struggle, Mohun Bagan's existence inspired the youth. In the sports world of Bengal, Mohun Bagan has still maintained its excellence. Even after 60 years, Mohun Bagan has kept its youth unaffected. I pray that on our beloved Motherland, Mohun Bagan's sporting spirit may survive forever."

— Chief Minister Dr. Bidhan Chandra Roy

On the club's diamond jubilee, West Bengal's Chief Minister Dr. Bidhan Chandra Roy was invited to exhibition matches hosted by the club, that included three friendlies against Swedish club Helsingborg. Runu Guha Thakurta, a renowned forward, was acquired by the club that year. In 1950, India had received a direct qualification to the FIFA World Cup, with club captain Manna being leading the team, but All India Football Federation refused to play. Despite acquiring the services of some of the famed players the club failed to dominate in major tournaments, where they were regularly outshined by the Pancha Pandav led East Bengal and Syed Abdul Rahim's Hyderabad City Police team.

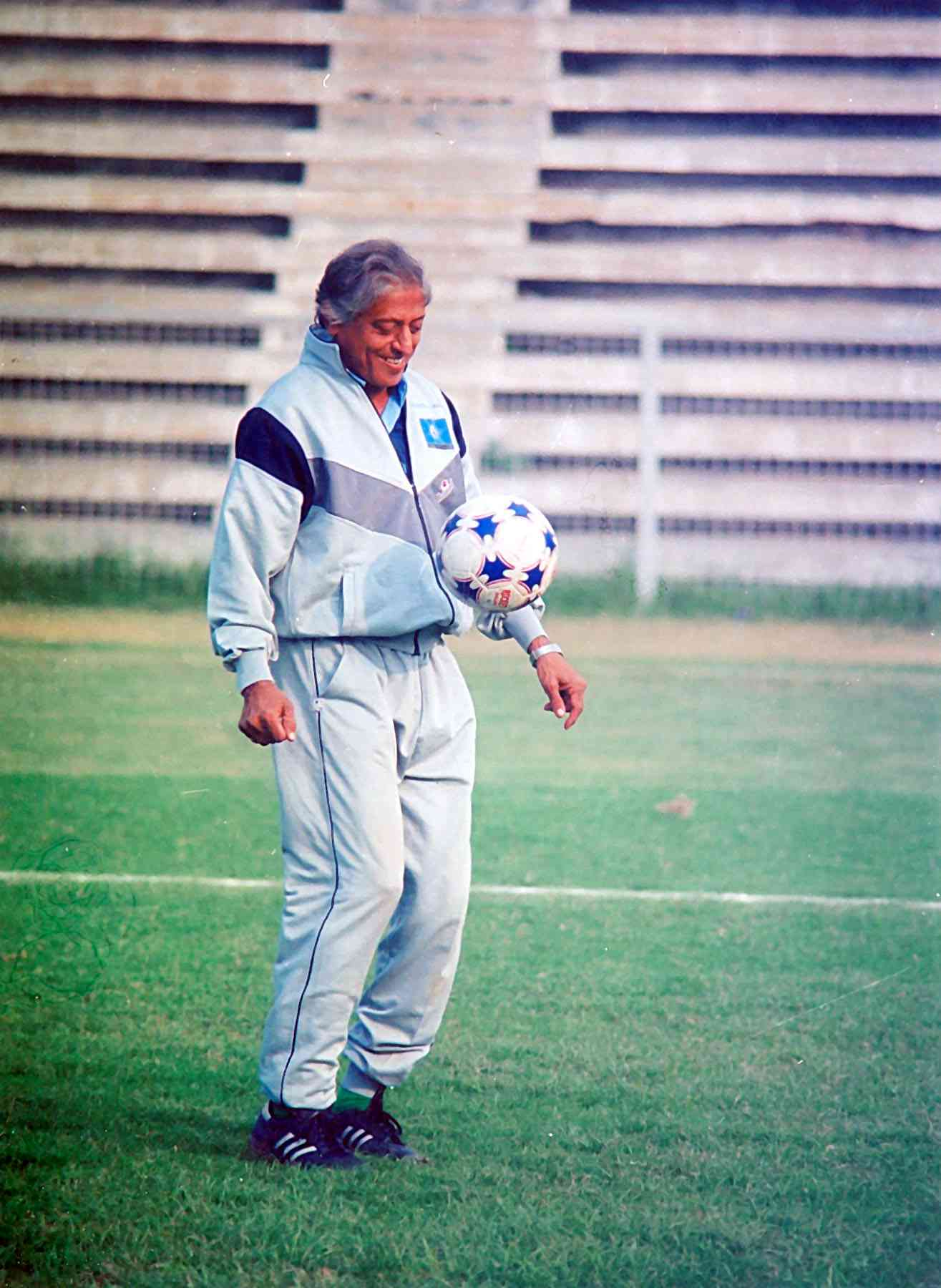
Chuni Goswami at Mohun Bagan Ground in 2020.

"Mohun Bagan was my favorite team from my childhood. I was a regular visitor of all Mohun Bagan matches when I was a student at Kolkata. Sometimes, when I didn't have money to buy the ticket, I could not stop myself. I watched the match from the outside. I was always aware of the up-to-date news of the club."

— President Dr. Rajendra Prasad

S Manna, T Aao, Abhay Ghosh, and R Guhathakurta got their call for the national team to play the Asian Games, and Manna led the team to the gold medal. In 1952 Summer Olympics three Mohun Bagan players including Manna as the captain and Mohammad Abdus Sattar, who joined the club from Mohammedan in 1950, was called for the national team. Mohun Bagan won the CFL in 1951 after a wait of seven years, the IFA Shield in 1952, and its first Durand Cup in 1953 by 4–0 against National Defence Academy team in the presence of President Dr. Rajendra Prasad. That year Samar 'Badru' Banerjee joined the team and formed an important attacking duo with Md. Sattar. During Manna's spell as the captain, he was named among the top 10 captains around the world by The Football Association in 1953, becoming the first Asian to have the honor. In 1954 Mohun Bagan became the first club ever to clinch the double crown of Calcutta — CFL and IFA Shield, and beat the Austrian club Grazer AK by 2–1 and beat the visiting Afghanistan by 3–0. The same year Subimal 'Chuni' Goswami joined the senior team from the club's youth ranks. Mohun Bagan defended the CFL title successfully till 1956 and won the IFA Shield and its first Rovers Cup in 1956. In December 1954, Mohun Bagan lost a match against AIK featuring Kurt Hamrin, by 3–1 and in March 1955, played against the visiting Soviet Union featuring Lev Yashin and lost by 3–0. Mohun Bagan also played against Austria in 1955, but lost by 2–0, and the following year Mohun Bagan, as a representative from India, toured Indonesia, Singapore, Hong Kong and Malaya, which was organized solely by the assistant secretary of the club Dhiren Dey. For the 1956 Summer Olympics in Melbourne, Badru captained the national team. While Krishnachandra 'Kesto' Pal was included in the main squad, Chuni, S Chatterjee, and Sushil Guha were selected as reserved players. The following years were mostly unsuccessful as the club failed to win several major trophies, but during this time, Mohun Bagan obtained the services of Jarnail Singh Dhillon from Rajasthan Club and Mariappa Kempaiah. The arrival of Thazhatheri Abdul Rahman at the back partnering Singh with Sanath Sett in goal, enhanced the team, resulting CFL and Durand Cup championships in 1959.

=== The golden team (1960–64) ===

Arun Sinha's 3–2–5 line-up in the 1962 IFA Shield final against Hyderabad City Police.

Mohun Bagan in 1960, won CFL, IFA Shield, and Durand Cup, losing just once in the 42 matches played in these three tournaments. Based on their dominative performance, they were invited to a number of matches in East Africa travelling to Uganda, Kenya, Zanzibar and Tanganyika. On the recommendations of Chuni and Kempiah, Isaiyah Arumayinayigam had joined the team before the tour, and soon earned the nickname "Baby Taxi" for his pace. During the tour, out of nineteen matches 15 were won, 3 were drawn and only 1 was lost, while domestically Mohun Bagan won the Shield consecutively in 1961 and 1962. Under Dhiren Dey, a strict regime was reinstated in the club and under the coaching of Arun Sinha, the archaic 2–3–5 formation was replaced by 3-defenders system. Sinha was primarily responsible for properly grooming the likes of Chuni and Jarnail. On 27 April 1962, Gostho Pal received the Padma Shri, becoming the first footballer to do so. The club won its tenth CFL title and IFA Shield that year. Chuni was selected to lead the national team in 1962 Asian Games and won the gold medal, with Jarnail Singh playing a pivotal part in the campaign. Ashok Chatterjee, a well-built forward, was another vital addition to the team in 1962. In 1963, Mohun Bagan won CFL again and added Durand Cup to their cabinet after a 2–0 victory against Andhra Pradesh Police. A new club tent was inaugurated this year by the Chief of Army Staff Jayanto Nath Chaudhuri and the Chief Minister Prafulla Chandra Sen. 1964 saw Mohun Bagan celebrate its platinum jubilee with a year-long celebration involving numerous sporting events. Popular Hungarian club Tatabánya was invited to play a series of friendly matches. Fittingly, the club enjoyed massive success in cricket by winning CAB Cricket League, in hockey by winning Aga Khan Gold Cup, in football by winning the IFA Shield, the CFL and the Durand Cup by defeating East Bengal. In this period of five years, the star-studded team of Mohun Bagan won twelve major trophies; excluding Coochbehar Cup and Trades Cup.

=== Decline and revival under P. K. Banerjee (1965–1970s) ===
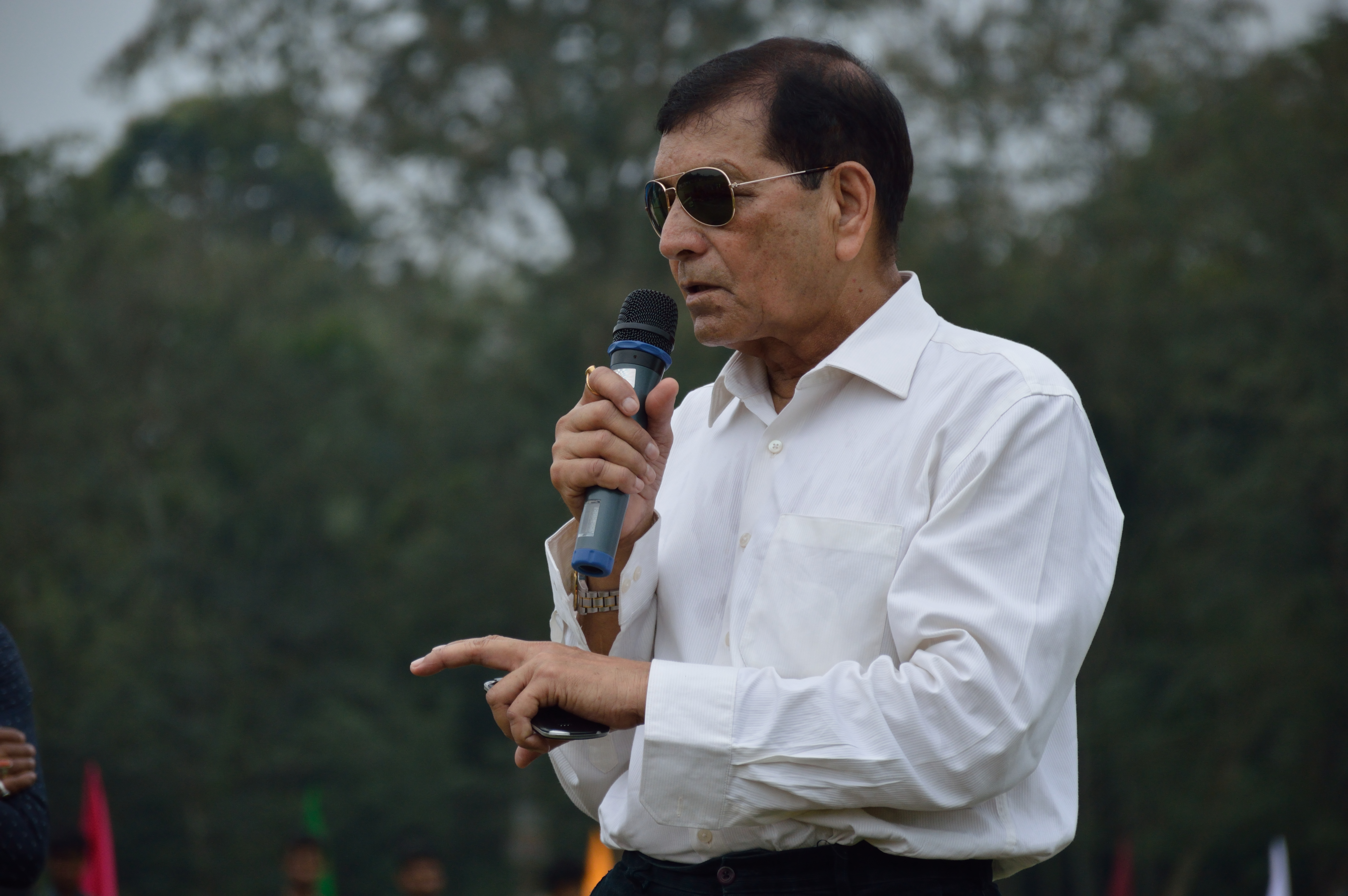
Syed Nayeemuddin played for five years (1968–74) and later became the coach (1992–93, 1996, and 1999).

Amal Dutta's 4–2–4 line-up against East Bengal in the 1969 IFA Shield final.

In the following years additions like Chandreshwar Prasad in 1965, Pungam Kannan in 1967 and Sukalyan Ghosh Dastidar in 1969 were made, and Jarnail was made the new captain of the team in 1965. Yet the team lost the consistency soon and, in 1967 and 1968 Mohun Bagan won just two trophies, the Shield and Rovers Cup, respectively. Chuni retired from football in 1968 after spending his whole career at Mohun Bagan; thus, the golden team slowly came to a conclusion.

In 1969 Amal Dutta joined and introduced the concept of overlapping full-backs in 4–2–4 to Indian football, for which Bhabani Roy was the primary candidate. With the new strategy in place, Mohun Bagan played scintillating football and captured CFL and IFA Shield with a 3–1 victory against East Bengal in the Shield final. Mohun Bagan struggled to assert dominance in the first half of the 1970s and failed to match their arch-rivals regarding team building. Although they won Rovers Cup from 1970 to 1972, they fared poorly in other major tournaments. With foreign recruits becoming common in East Bengal, Mohun Bagan failed to beat them even once between 1969 and 1974 and lost to their arch-rivals in Durand Cup and IFA Shield finals multiple times. The lowest point of their decline came in 1975 IFA Shield final when Mohun Bagan lost 5–0 to East Bengal, the biggest margin of defeat in the derby till then. The ignominy surrounding the heavy defeat was that several Mohun Bagan players spent the night holed up on a boat in the Ganges as the supporters laid siege to the club tent.

In May 1972, Mohun Bagan toured to newly independent Bangladesh to play exhibition matches, where they defeated Dhaka Mohammedan in their first match, but lost to Shadhin Bangla. Mohun Bagan did recruit a number of young players in 1974 and 1975 so as to steer the team back to success. Subrata Bhattacharya, Prasun Banerjee and Narayanswami Ulaganathan made the team in 1974 and in 1975, Compton Dutta and Dilip Palit joined. By 1976 Mohun Bagan assembled their best team in years under the helm of Chandra Madhab Roy with the inclusion of a host of players from their two local rivals, including the attacking brothers–Mohammed Habib and Mohammed Akbar, and Subhash Bhowmick. Prasun's elder brother, P.K. Banerjee was employed for the managerial post after his immensely successful spell at East Bengal. Under him, 1976 turned into one of the best years in the club's history when Mohun Bagan won their first CFL and IFA Shield titles since 1969 and added Rovers Cup to their success. Most significantly, Mohun Bagan ended a seven-year wait to win the Derby in 1976 with a 17s header from Akbar, assisted by Ulanganathan. Along with Shyam Thapa, other iconic names like Sudhir Karmakar and Gautam Sarkar, who was affectionately called "Indian Beckenbauer", also joined Mohun Bagan in the following year. With a domineering squad, Mohun Bagan yet suffered a shocking defeat of 1–0 against ITI team in the inaugural Federation Cup, which became the most prestigious title in the country, and also lost the first Derby of that year. But they successfully became the first club to win the "Triple Crown" – the IFA Shield, the Durand Cup, and the Rovers Cup, in that year and as per club traditions, they invited East Bengal for dinner.

Supposed formation of PK Banerjee's Mohun Bagan against NY Cosmos.

On 24 September 1977, through the efforts of Dhiren Dey, Mohun Bagan played a friendly match against the American club New York Cosmos which featured Brazilian World Cup winners like Pelé and Carlos Torres, and Serie A icon Giorgio Chinaglia. The game, which took place at Eden Gardens, had a match attendance of 80,000 along with the Chief Minister of West Bengal Jyoti Basu. NY Cosmos had taken a lead through Alberto, but it was soon equalized by Thapa, then took the lead through Habib but late in the game, Chinaglia's goal kept the final scoreline at 2–2. One of the remarkable instances in the game was Shibaji's brilliant save to deny a Pelé free-kick. This match become one of the prominent events in the history of the club since the 1911 IFA Shield final.

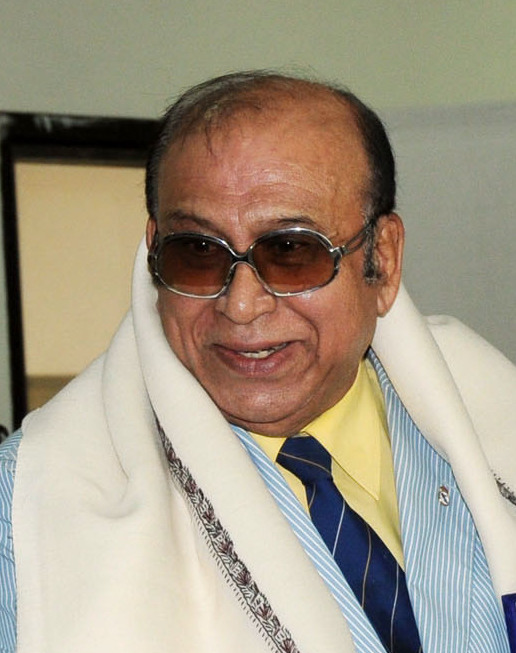
P.K. Banerjee in 2011.

After the further additions of Manas Bhattacharya and Shyamal Banerjee, Mohun Bagan continued their dominant run in 1978, consisting of a CFL win with record 78 goals in 22 matches and a Federation Cup joint-win with East Bengal. In the IFA Shield final, Mohun Bagan was up against the Soviet club Ararat Yereven featuring Arkady Andreasyan and Khoren Oganesian. The visitors with an early lead, struggled with the wet climatic conditions, Mohun Bagan raced to a 2–1 lead with the goals from Habib and Manas, but a late goal from Oganesian prevented a famous win for Mohun Bagan, and both the clubs were declared winners. Thus, the club became the first Indian team, post-independence, to win the IFA Shield while competing against a non-Asian side in the final.

=== The National Club of India (1980s) ===
The dominance in Durand Cup and Federation Cup continued in 1980, meanwhile CFL and IFA Shield was called off after a tragic incident that took place during the Derby on 16 August where sixteen people died in a riot among the supporters inside Vivekananda Yuba Bharati Krirangan.

Starting 11 of Mohun Bagan in 1981 Federation Cup final.

In 1981 Mohun Bagan won their first standalone Federation Cup after beating Mohammedan by 2–0 with goals from Ulaganathan and Thapa and added IFA Shield and Rovers Cup to the collection as well. The club made some impactful signings like Krishanu Dey, Krishnendu Roy and Sudip 'Tulu' Chatterjee.1983 was a comparatively unsuccessful year. After six successful years, the club only managed to win Calcutta League, with Manas Bhattacharya being the league's top scorer. As a result, a host of new players were recruited in 1984, and the most notable names being Prasanta Banerjee, Babu Mani and Tanumoy Basu, and that led to major successes, including Durand Cup and the Calcutta League title. Later, Sisir Ghosh was brought in and he made a successful attacking duo with Mani. In 1986 players like Satyajit Chatterjee, Aloke Mukherjee and Amit Bhadra were to the squad, and the year ended with the Calcutta League, third consecutive Durand Cup and the Federation Cup after a four-year wait and also qualifying for the 1987 Asian Club Championship. Mohun Bagan won twice in the group stage of Asian Championship with 12 goals, half of which were scored by Sisir. However, finishing second in the group failed to progress to the semi-final group. They qualified for ACC once again for the 1988–89 season by winning the 1987 Federation Cup and displayed outstanding performance in the group stage, including a 6–0 defeat of Pakistani team Crescent Textiles Mill with a hat-trick from Sisir. Still, in the semi-final group, they lost every game and finished at the bottom. At the domestic level, the club failed to win any major tournament except Rovers Cup.

== Post-centenary ==
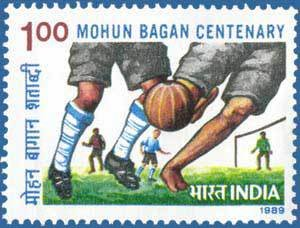
1989 postage stamp commemorating the centenary year of Mohun Bagan

Mohun Bagan celebrated their 100th anniversary in 1989 with a grand torch rally starting from Basu Bati in North Kolkata and covered several important places in Mohun Bagan's history before reaching the Mohun Bagan Ground. The Prime Minister of India Rajiv Gandhi arrived for the celebrations and during his speech, he referred to Mohun Bagan as "The National Club of India". Mohun Bagan became the first club to be honored by a postage stamp from the government of India on this historical year.

=== Commercialisation and incoming of foreigners (1990–2000) ===
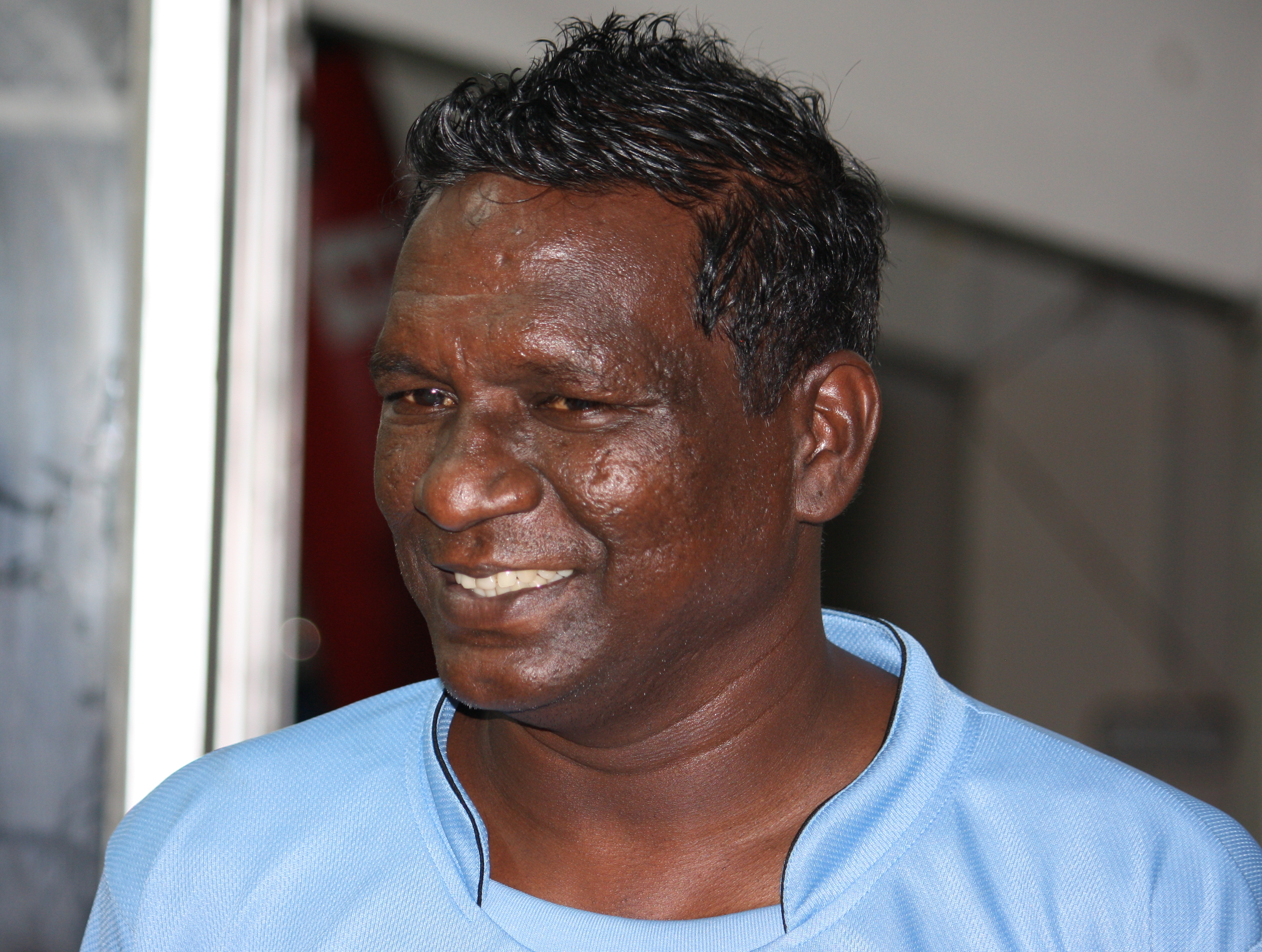
I.M. Vijayan played for Mohun Bagan for a total of 3 years and was nicknamed "Kalo Horin" (transl. Black Buck) by the fans.

The centenary celebrations continued till 1990 when Mohun Bagan played against an assembled team that featured Cameroonian World Cupper Roger Milla. The club invested significantly to bring back Krishanu Dey and Babu Mani and along with other major signings like Bikash Panji and especially I. M. Vijayan, who was being approached by every major club in the country. In 1991 Mohun Bagan made their first-ever foreign recruitment, which was a Nigerian striker Chima Okorie from East Bengal, and later the second foreign signing was another Nigerian striker Bernard Operanozie, who would play as a defender. With the arrival of Syed Nayeemuddin on the bench, Mohun Bagan defended their Rovers Cup and won another Federation Cup in 1992. The following year Oparanozie got the captain's responsibilities after Bhadra got out with injury, and being the club's first foreign captain, he led the team to win Federation Cup again. Mohun Bagan also famously won over Croatian club Varteks that year in the group stage of DCM Trophy. 1994 was a decorative year with four trophies including Federation Cup for the third consecutive time, Durand Cup after an eight-year wait, and the CFL. While in 1993–94 Asian Club Championship, Mohun Bagan easily thumped Club Valencia and Ratnam in the preliminary stage, but after a 4–0 away loss to Thai Farmers' Bank in the 1st leg of the second round, Mohun Bagan was ejected out of the tournament for refusing to play the 2nd leg in Malaysia. India was amid plague outbreak and Mohun Bagan failed to win any major trophy for the following two years.

Mohun Bagan's preferred line-up under Amal Dutta in his "Diamond System".

In December 1996 the National Football League began as the top-tier league in the country and Mohun Bagan finished at the bottom in the group stage with just one win and was relegated in the next season, which was later revoked by the organizers. The club appointed their former coach, Amal Dutta and under him, Mohun Bagan began to play in an innovative 3–4–3 "Diamond System", which was bolstered by the likes of Abdul Khaliq and Okerie in the front, Mohun Bagan played very offensively, which was rare in Indian football. The glamorous success achieved by Amal Dutta and P.K. Banerjee, who was now coaching East Bengal, had given birth to a significant coaching rivalry between them during the 80s, which reached its peak at the 1997 Federation Cup semi-final. It was one of the most anticipated matches in Indian football history, pitting two fierce rivalries – Mohun Bagan and Amal Dutta against East Bengal and P.K. Banerjee – at one stage. With a record 131,000 attendance at Vivekananda Yuba Bharati Krirangan, Mohun Bagan's defensive frailties were exposed by Bhaichung Bhutia, who scored a hattrick in a 4–1 victory for East Bengal. Despite the loss, fans lauded Mohun Bagan's impressive style of play under Dutta's Diamond System. Regardless, the club steered back to win the 1997–98 National Football League with ten matches unbeaten run and only two losses in the league, under the mentorship of T. K. Chathunni after Dutta left midway due to internal strife with the club officials. Players like Okorie, Dipendu Biswas, Reazul Mustafa and Sri Lankan winger Roshan Pereira played pivotal roles in the team.

In 1998, United Spirits, a subsidiary of Vijay Mallya owned United Breweries Group, entered into a partnership with Mohun Bagan by buying a 50% stake in the club's football division and formed a joint-venture entity named United Mohun Bagan Private Limited. For the first time the club was transformed into a corporate establishment from a society status, and the name of the club's football division was thus changed to McDowell's Mohun Bagan FC. That season saw them defeat Uzbek giant Pakhtakor Tashkent in the IFA Shield group stage, and eventually win the Shield. Mohun Bagan signed a host of foreigners for the 1999–00 National Football League. Renowned internationals like Uzbek striker Igor Shkvyrin, Nigerian forward Stephen Abarowei, Thai full-back Dusit Chalermsan and Kenyan defender Samuel "Pamzo" Omollo, and Brazilian José Ramirez Barreto joined the club. The Indian contingent in the club was kept almost intact from the last season with the addition of the striker R.C. Prakash and full-back Dulal Biswas, Mohun Bagan comfortably won the league along with Durand Cup and Rovers Cup with former club player Subrata Bhattacharya at the helm. But at the continental stage, got eliminated with an 8–0 defeat against Júbilo Iwata in the second round of the 1999–00 Asian Club Championship.

=== Heightened foreign influence (2000–2010) ===
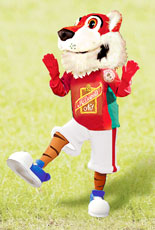
Baggu, Mohun Bagan's mascot.

In the 2001–02 season Mohun Bagan's bid to win back-to-back league titles was shattered when they finished second by just a point behind East Bengal. However, Barreto finished as the league's top scorer. Mohun Bagan captured the 2001 Federation Cup due to the heroics of goalkeeper Bibhas Ghosh and Barreto, who was awarded the tournament's best player. Mohun Bagan also triumphed in the Bordoloi Trophy after thrashing Thai club Rajpracha 4–0 in the final. Mohun Bagan's squad was joined by another Nigerian, Abdulatif Seriki replacing Omollo. On the final matchday, in a must-win situation against the title contender – Churchill Brothers, Mohun Bagan clinched their third league title with a 73rd-minute header by the Nigerian defender Abdul Wastu Saliu assisted by Basudeb Mandal's corner kick. Under Subrata Bhattacharya, Mohun Bagan became the first club to win Federation Cup and NFL in a season. Bhaichung Bhutia, who had joined the club in 2002 missed out on most of the season to injuries producing a negligible impact on the team. As a result, Mohun Bagan's on-field form slumped remarkably with the club winning just one major trophy in the form of the IFA Shield in these two years. To make matters worse, in 2004 Mohun Bagan's most influential foreigner – Barreto also left the club and Mohun Bagan finished 7th and 9th in 2002–03 and 2003–04 seasons respectively. The barren period of major trophies also continued next season, as they finished 8th in the league and runner-up in Federation Cup. In 2004, Mohun Bagan became the first Indian club to launch a credit card in association with ICICI Bank.

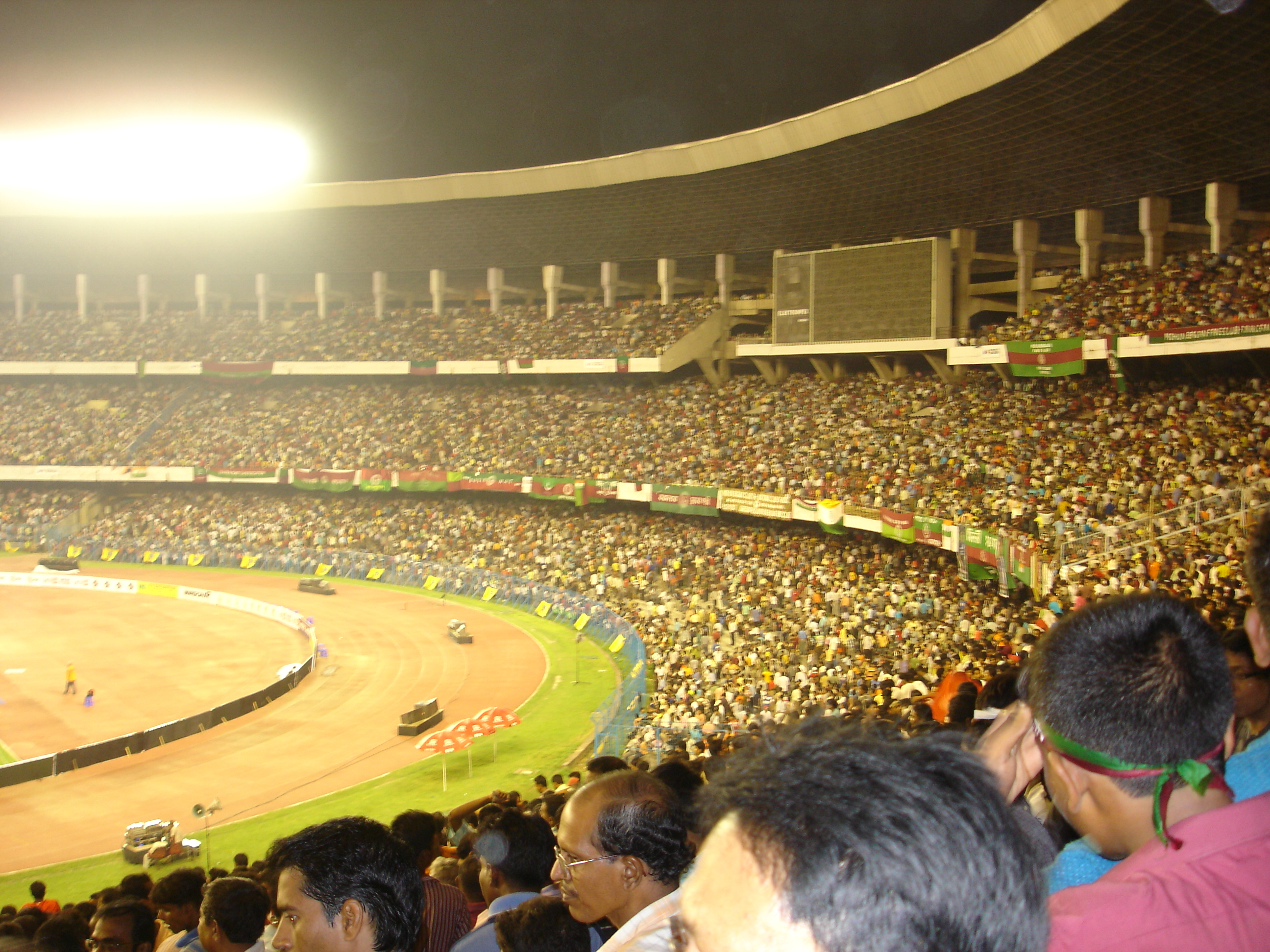
Crowd at the exhibition match against Bayern Munich.

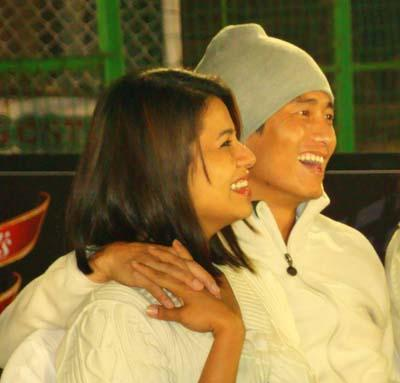
Bhaichung Bhutia, with his wife, at Mohun Bagan Ground in 2009.

With internal problems slowly subsiding, Mohun Bagan assembled a strong side in 2006 that included Barreto and Bhaichung's return, along with a combative Brazilian midfielder Douglas Silva. The team was further bolstered with top Indian players like Sangram Mukherjee, Deepak Mondal as well as youngsters like Lalawmpuia Pachuau, Lalkamal Bhowmick and Sushil Kumar Singh. With the sudden resignation of coach Biswajit Bhattacharya, the Brazilian physio of the team, Robson Mattos was hastily promoted as the team's coach. Bhutia and Sangram's collective heroics led them to their 12th Federation Cup. While the 2006–07 league season did not go well with as many as three foreign coaches taking part during the campaign in the form of Robson Mattos and former players – Chima Okorie and Bernard Oparanozie. FIFA president Sepp Blatter came to Kolkata and attended Mohun Bagan's won 2–1 Derby win on 15 April 2007. On Mohun Bagan Day, the club became the first in India to launch an official mascot which was a tiger named "Baggu". In 2007 Mohun Bagan sealed their first-ever Indian Super Cup with a 4–0 victory over the league champions Dempo, with Bhutia scoring a hattrick. In 2007–08 season, where NFL got rebranded as I-League, Brazilian coach Carlos Roberto Pereira took the reins of the team but failed to win any significant accolade. The following season, Mohun Bagan appointed Moroccan coach Karim Bencherifa, who led the team to a record 10-match winning run in the league and a Federation Cup victory. Still, poor performance in his second league resulted in him being sacked midway through the 2009–10 season and putting Satyajit Chatterjee as the interim coach. The only highlight of his second campaign was the 5–3 Derby victory on 25 October 2009.

In 2008, Mohun Bagan players got the opportunity to play against German icon Oliver Kahn in his official testimonial match for Bayern Munich, which also featured Brazilian star Zé Roberto. The match was played on 27 May 2008 at Vivekananda Yuba Bharati Krirangan and finished with Bayern Munich comfortably winning by 3–0. The same year Argentine World Cup winner Diego Maradona paid a visit to the club tent during a tour to India.

=== Struggles in the new decade followed by significant success (2010–2020) ===
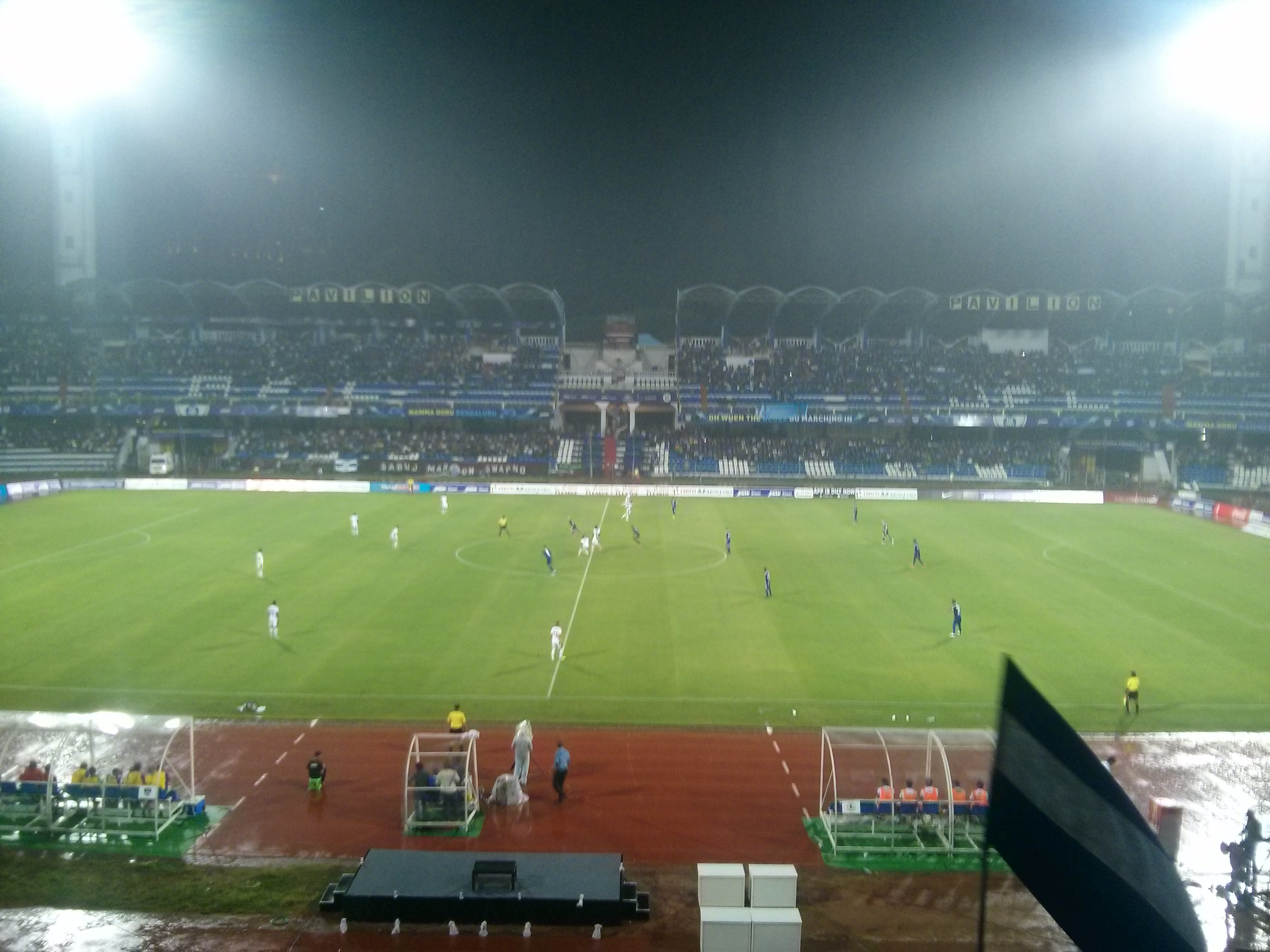
Bengaluru vs Mohun Bagan, the final match of 2014–15 I-League.

Mohun Bagan emerged as third ranked Indian team and 611th position worldwide, in the international rankings of clubs during the first ten years of the 21st century (2001–2010) issued by the International Federation of Football History & Statistics in 2011. The club though struggled for supremacy in the first five years of the new decade, and the seasons were marked by poor team recruitment, which lacked balance and overpaying for players. The management focused only on recruiting big names while ignoring essential areas of the team which needed bolstering. Some of the foreign stars recruited during this period were Odafa Onyeka Okolie from Churchill Brothers, with a record salary of ₹1.4 crores per year in 2011, Muritala Ali from Mahindra United and Tolgay Özbey from East Bengal. These players failed to replicate their form shown at their former clubs and as a result Mohun Bagan teams which were often built around them also suffered. After an illustrious career at Mohun Bagan, Barreto finally made his exit in 2012. A crowd of over 50,000 turned up at Vivekananda Yuba Bharati Krirangan on 6 May 2012 as Barreto played his last match for the club against Pune, where he scored his final goal for the team. The Brazilian ended his career at the club as the first foreigner to score over 200 goals in India for a club with his final tally reading 228 goals in 371 matches.

The club endured a phase of five years without a major trophy between 2010 and 2015, the longest such phase since the nation's independence. Although Mohun Bagan won the 2012 Airlines Cup, it wasn't a major trophy anymore. On 29 December 2012, Mohun Bagan was barred from competing in I-League for two years following a decision taken by the league's core committee. The suspension came because Mohun Bagan had refused to take the field in the second half of the match against East Bengal on 9 December 2012 due to crowd violence and an unsuitable atmosphere for the continuation of the match. All their results in the 2012-13 season were declared null and void and all their remaining fixtures were cancelled. However, on 15 January 2013, Mohun Bagan appealed against the decision and were reinstated, but a hefty amount was fined, their officials were suspended from all the AIFF meetings for a year and, the team would start with 0 points and would play out only the remaining 16 fixtures in the league. This did not affect their win-loss and goal difference record in the table. This led the team in a dire relegation fight but were successful to avoided it. In the following season, the team performed disastrously and finished 8th in the table, scarcely avoiding relegation. A constant incoming and outgoing of coaches saw established names like Subrata Bhattacharya, Subhash Bhowmick and Karim Bencherifa, along with younger coaches like Stanley Rozario and Santosh Kashyap failing to end the precarious state of the team.

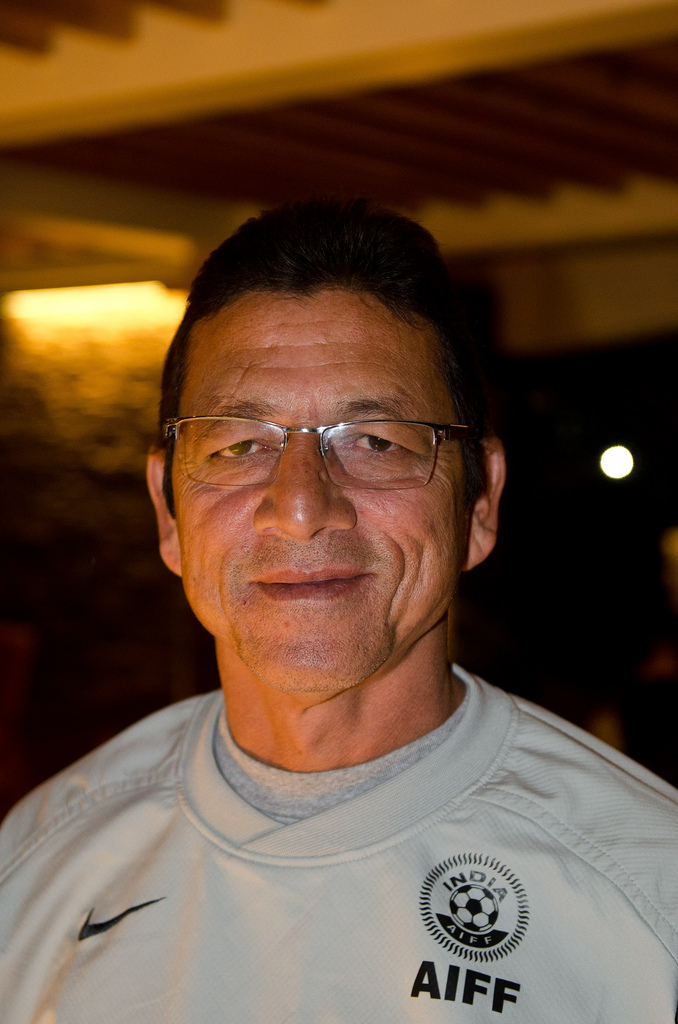
Sanjay Sen, who led Mohun Bagan to its first I-League trophy.

Mohun Bagan started the 2014–15 season with Subhash Bhowmick on the bench. However, after finishing as runners in CFL and Bhowmick's lack of mandatory AFC Pro license saw Sanjoy Sen taking over the reins before Federation Cup. Mohun Bagan's Cup campaign did not go well as they crashed out of the tournament after a 4–1 loss against Salgaocar. With the likes of Katsumi Yusa, Sony Nordé and Balwant Singh often making the headlines, Mohun Bagan made into the final league match away against the title contender Bengaluru with just a point advantage, that ended in a draw, thereby winning their first major trophy in five seasons and the first league title in eleven years. Mohun Bagan had reached their quasquicentennial year of existence in 2014, therefore club organized a huge rally in North Kolkata chiefly to celebrate the anniversary on 1 June 2015. The celebration was capped off with their league victory achieved the previous month. The victory parade saw around 200,000 supporters, by some estimates, lined up along the streets, with prominent former club associates like P.K. Banerjee, Manas Bhattacharya, Bidesh Bose, Compton Dutta, Shibaji Banerjee, and Satyajit Chatterjee involved with the celebrations. FIFA president Sepp Blatter also congratulated Mohun Bagan in a special letter. At the continental stage, Mohun Bagan became the first Indian club to win a match in AFC Champions League and qualify for the second preliminary round of ACL qualifying play-offs, when they defeated Singaporen club Tampines Rovers by 3–1. Mohun Bagan also recorded the biggest margin of victory by an Indian club in an AFC Cup away match when they defeated Hong Kong club South China by 4–0. In that edition, the team also reached the round of 16 but got eliminated by Tampines Rovers.

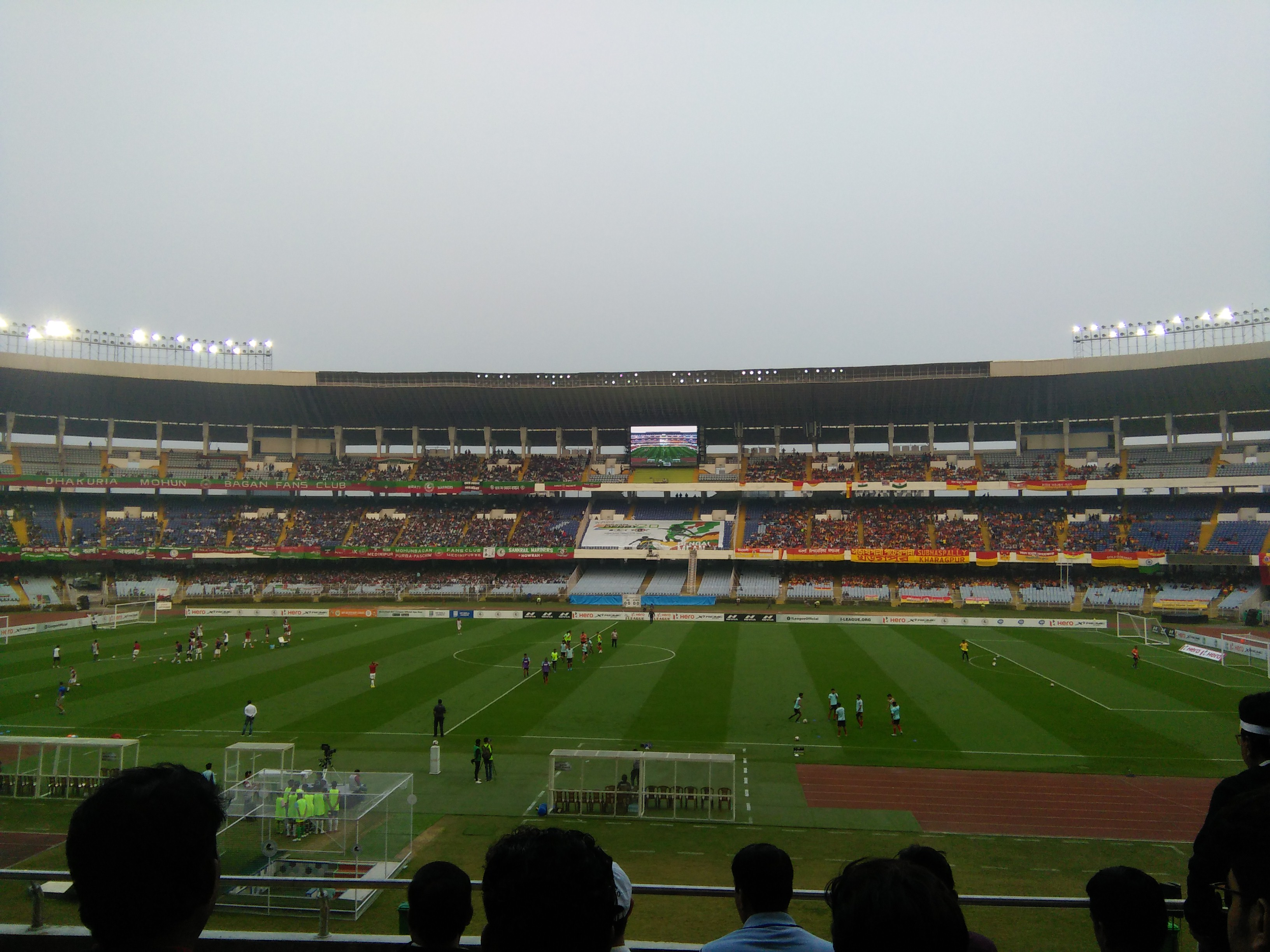
Mohun Bagan's 2–1 Kolkata Derby victory, held on 19 January 2020.

After a breakaway from United Breweries in 2015, Mohun Bagan was once again re-established as a society. Still, in 2017 Mohun Bagan Football Club (India) Private Limited was registered as a legal entity on 31 July 2017. The new legal entity created was exclusively for all football activities of Mohun Bagan. On 28 September 2018 in the Clash of Legends (a match between the teams of retired former players of the respective clubs), Mohun Bagan Legends hosted Barcelona Legends at Vivekananda Yuba Bharati Krirangan, that was attended by a crowd of 45,000, along with one of the directors of Barcelona Pau Vilanova and the mayor of Kolkata Sovan Chatterjee. The fixture concluded with a heavy defeat for the hosts by a score-line of 6–0. The following three seasons since the title win, Mohun Bagan continued their strong contest for trophies, but succeeding to win only the 2016 Federation Cup, though foreigners like Yusa and Norde continued to make their presence felt with strong performances, along with single season signings like Darryl Duffy and Cornell Glen. Among the Indians, Jeje Lalpekhlua, Pritam Kotal, and Prabir Das produced some of their best performances for the team. In 2018, the team managed to reach the semi-final of the inaugural Super Cup that replaced Federation Cup as the country's top knock-out tournament. The following season was considerably poor under the new coach Khalid Jamil, as the team finished 5th on the table. The club also pulled out of Super Cup along with the other participating I-League clubs in protest against the unfair schedule favoring the Indian Super League clubs. Therefore, the season concluded with no national trophies in three consecutive seasons. The management appointed Kibu Vicuña for the next season, and he gave the leadership duties to Dhanachandra Singh and Gurjinder Kumar. He promoted several players like Subha Ghosh, Sk. Sahil and Kiyan Nassiri from the youth ranks to the first team and assembled a squad with a blend of youth and experience. Vicuña brought a brand of football to India, which was very similar to that commonly seen in Spain. He believed in playing a possession-based game and incorporated build-up from the back, for which he used Baba Diawara at the front and supported by Joseba Beitia with Nongdamba Naorem and V.P. Suhair running down the flanks. The midfield was dictated by Fran González while the defense was held by the strong pair of Daneil Cyrus and Fran Morante. With record 14 matches unbeaten run, Mohun Bagan sealed their second I-League title and fifth national league title on their 16th matchday with a 1–0 win over Aizawl at the Kalyani Stadium. With four matches still to be played, 2019–20 season was terminated by the AIFF due to the COVID-19 pandemic.

=== Entering the ISL and achieving success (2020–present) ===

Starting 11 of Mohun Bagan in the 2023 ISL Final

During this period, the organizers of ISL, as well as the club managements themselves, made efforts to include Mohun Bagan and East Bengal in the league. Accordingly, on 16 January 2020, it was announced that the RPSG Group (KGSPL), the owners of ATK FC, along with former cricketer Sourav Ganguly and businessmen Utsav Parekh, acquired an 80% stake in Mohun Bagan Football Club (India) Pvt Ltd, the legal entity owning the football division of Mohun Bagan. ATK FC was officially disbanded on 1 July 2020 and Mohun Bagan entered the Indian Super League in the 2020-21 season with the name ATK Mohun Bagan . In 2023, after severe protests from the Mohun Bagan supporters, KGSPL removed ATK and changed the name to Mohun Bagan Super Giant.

Mohun Bagan performed well in their first two ISL seasons under Antonio Lopez Habas, but it was in the 2022-23 season when they won their 1st ISL Cup title under Juan Ferrando by defeating Bengaluru FC 4-3 on penalties. After the win, Mr. Sanjeev Goenka himself announced the removal of ATK and the change of name to Mohun Bagan Super Giant.

Mohun Bagan started the 2023-24 season by winning the 2023 Durand Cup after defeating arch rivals East Bengal 1-0 in the Final and this was their record 17th Durand Cup win. They started the 2023-24 Indian Super League very well but their form declined and Antonio Habas replaced Ferrando as the head coach. After this, they turned things around with strong performances from the players and won their 1st ISL League Shield by defeating Mumbai City 2-1 on the last match day of the 2023-24 season. This was the 6th Indian League title for Mohun Bagan. In the 2024-25 Indian Super League Mohun Bagan became the first team to successfully defend their League title as they won their 2nd consecutive League Shield and 7th Indian League title with a 1-0 win against Odisha FC with two matches left. Mohun Bagan ended their league stage campaign with a win over FC Goa with 2-0, shattering numerous ISL and Indian football team records, notably being the first Indian club to reach 1000 points in cummulative Indian top division leagues competitions. As of March 2025, Mohun Bagan have never lost a Kolkata derby to arch rivals East Bengal in the ISL and have dominated the fixture significantly.
