= 1998 Indian Federation Cup =

21st edition of the Federation Cup

1998 Federation Cup
Kalyani Black Label Federation Cup

Tournament details
- Country: India
- Dates: 23 August–12 September 1998
- Teams: 16

Final positions
- Champions: Mohun Bagan (10th title)
- Runners-up: East Bengal

Tournament statistics
- Matches played: 16
- Goals scored: 36 (2.25 per match)
- Top goal scorer(s): Cyril Barreto (4 goals)

Awards
- Best player: Amit Das (Mohun Bagan)

The 1998 Indian Federation Cup (also known as 1998 Kalyani Black Label Federation Cup) due to sponsorship reasons, was the 21st season of the Indian Federation Cup. It was held between 23 August and 12 September 1998. Salgaocar were the defending champions, but were eliminated in the first round by State Bank of Travancore. Mohun Bagan won the tournament for the tenth time, following a 2–1 over East Bengal in the final played at the Salt Lake Stadium, Kolkata, a replay of the previous edition's semifinal when the latter won. Amit Das and Hemanta Dora of Mohun Bagan were named the Player and Goalkeeper of the Tournament.

== Qualification ==
For the 1998 edition, the All India Football Federation (AIFF) decided to increase the number of entries to justify the tournament as that "for champion clubs" on the back of two decades of "[failure] to achieve its propagated aims and objectives." Accordingly, on 16 July 1998, the President of AIFF, Priya Ranjan Dasmunsi, announced that the edition would have 48 teams competing. Eight teams would be seeded directly into the round of 16 and eight other teams would qualify from five zones: North, East, North-East, West and South. He added that the qualifying rounds would be played on a knock-out basis, and that top two teams from South Zone and the winners of the four other zones would qualify for the tournament proper, while the other two would come from a play-off among runners-up of the four zones. Salgaocar, East Bengal, Mohun Bagan, Mohammedan, Border Security Force, Indian Telephone Industries, Dempo and Churchill Brothers were announced as the eight seeded teams. A report carried by Sportstar said that the teams were seeded based on their quarter-final entry in the previous edition.

The qualification round saw 37 teams vying from five zones for the eight spots. A then newly formed club, Bengal Mumbai, was not allowed to enter the competition from the West Zone as, according to the AIFF, "the team would have to come through the state league and prove themselves."

=== Qualified teams ===
Team	Qualified as	Qualified on
Border Security Force	1997 quarter-final	16 July
Churchill Brothers	1997 quarter-final	16 July
Dempo	1997 quarter-final	16 July
East Bengal	1997 quarter-final	16 July
Indian Telephone Industries	1997 quarter-final	16 July
JCT Mills	North Zone winner	10 August
Jorba Durga	East Zone winner	22 July
Kochin	South Zone winner	2 August
Langsning	North-East Zone winner	1 August
Mohammedan	1997 quarter-final	16 July
Mohun Bagan	1997 quarter-final	16 July
Punjab State Electricity Board	Play-off winner	23 August
Salgaocar	1997 quarter-final	16 July
State Bank of Travancore	South Zone runner-up	2 August
Tollygunge Agragami	Play-off winner	20 August
Vasco	West Zone winner	8 August

== Results ==
In case of a tie at regular time, extra time with golden goal was used. In case scores remain tied even after extra time, penalty shoot-out was used.

=== Pre-quarterfinals (round of 16) ===
23 August

Dempo	0–2	Vasco
	Report	Gadekar 62'; Nickson 64'

Nehru Stadium, Margao

23 August

East Bengal	3–1	Jorba Durga
Biswas 90'; Mondal 57'; Vijayan 84'	Report	Thapa 82'

Barabati Stadium, Cuttack
Attendance: 10,000

24 August
14:00 IST

Churchill Brothers	7–0	Langsning
Barreto 4', 6', 8', 17'; Soares 43'; Ansari 75', 76'	Report

Ambedkar Stadium, New Delhi

24 August

Salgaocar	0–1	State Bank of Travancore
	Report	Ignatius 90'

Cooperage Ground, Mumbai

25 August

Border Security Force	1–0	Tollygunge Agragami
Gauranga Pal 71'	Report

Ambedkar Stadium, New Delhi

27 August

Mohun Bagan	2–0	Kochin
Okorie 13', 26'	Report

Salt Lake Stadium, Kolkata

27 August

Indian Telephone Industries	0–1	Punjab State Electricity Board
		Gurdish Singh 26'

Bangalore

28 August

Mohammedan Sporting	1–0 (a.e.t.)	JCT Mills
Owino 116'	Report

Salt Lake Stadium, Kolkata
Attendance: 8,000

=== Quarter-finals ===
27 August
14:00 IST

Churchill Brothers	2–1 (a.e.t.)	Border Security Force
Mensah 32', 111' (pen.)	Report	Singh 84'

Ambedkar Stadium, New Delhi
Referee: Ramesh Rehani

28 August

Vasco	0–5	East Bengal
	Report	Vijayan 38', 45'; R. Singh 56', 86'; Chapman 86'

Bangalore

30 August

Mohammedan Sporting	0–0 (a.e.t.)	Punjab State Electricity Board
	Report
Penalties
Moses Ohira (penalty scored); Joy Kabui (penalty scored); Amitava Ghosh (penalty scored); Subir Ghosh (penalty scored); Arjan Ali (penalty missed)	4–3	Sandeep Saini (penalty scored); Jujhar Singh (penalty scored); Harjap Singh (penalty scored); Dalip Kumar (penalty missed); Sukhbir Singh (penalty missed)

Salt Lake Stadium, Kolkata

31 August

Mohun Bagan	1–0	State Bank of Travancore
Omollo 82'	Report

Cooperage Ground, Mumbai
Referee: Gokuldas Nagvenkar (Goa)

=== Semi-finals ===
5 September

East Bengal	1–0	Churchill Brothers
R. Singh 70'	Report

Kanchenjunga Stadium, Siliguri

6 September

Mohammedan Sporting	1–2	Mohun Bagan
Kabui 70'	Report	Vijayan 50'; Okorie 79'

Salt Lake Stadium, Kolkata

=== Third place play-off ===
12 September

Churchill Brothers	1–1	Mohammedan Sporting
Elvis Fernandes 90'	Report

Salt Lake Stadium, Kolkata

=== Final ===
12 September

Mohun Bagan	2–1	East Bengal
Amit Das 10'; Vijayan 20'	Report	Chapman 85'

Salt Lake Stadium, Kolkata

== Statistics ==
=== Goalscorers ===
4 goals

- Cyril Barreto (Churchill Brothers)

3 goals

- Renedy Singh (East Bengal)
- Raman Vijayan (East Bengal)
- Chima Okorie (Mohun Bagan)

2 goals

- Aqeel Ansari (Churchill Brothers)
- Philip Mensah (Churchill Brothers)
- Carlton Chapman (East Bengal)
- I. M. Vijayan (Mohun Bagan)

1 goal

- Gauranga Pal (Border Security Force)
- Harvinder Singh (Border Security Force)
- Mario Soares (Churchill Brothers)
- Elvis Fernandes (Churchill Brothers)
- Dipendu Biswas (East Bengal)
- Basudeb Mondal (East Bengal)
- Suraj Thapa (Jorba Durga)
- Cassius Owino (Mohammedan Sporting)
- Joy Kabui (Mohammedan Sporting)
- Sammy Omollo (Mohun Bagan)
- Gurdish Singh (Punjab State Electricity Board)
- Sylvester Ignatius (State Bank of Travancore)
- Premanand Gadekar (Vasco)
- Louis Nickson (Vasco)

=== Awards ===
Player of the Tournament
Amit Das (Mohun Bagan)
Best Goalkeeper
Hemanta Dora (Mohun Bagan)

=== Prize money ===
United Breweries Group sponsored the tournament and announced a prize money of ₹2 million for the winning team. The team that came second, third and fourth were given ₹1.5 million, ₹1 million and ₹500,000 respectively. All the other teams that participated in the tournament proper received ₹100,000 each.
