= 1997 Indian Federation Cup final =

- Event: 1997 Indian Federation Cup
East Bengal	Salgaocar
1	2
- After golden goal extra time
- Date: 20 July 1997
- Venue: Salt Lake Stadium, Kolkata, West Bengal
- Man of the Match: Bruno Coutinho
- Referee: Gulab Chouhan (Gujarat)
- Attendance: 1,20,000(Over)

The 1997 Indian Federation Cup final was the 20th final of the Indian Federation Cup, the top knock-out competition in India, and was contested between Kolkata giant East Bengal and Salgaocar of Goa on 20 July 1997 at the Salt Lake Stadium in Kolkata.

Salgaocar won the final 2–1 courtesy of a Golden goal by Bruno Coutinho in the extra-time to claim their third Federation Cup title.

== Route to the final ==
=== East Bengal ===
Round	Date	Opposition	Score
Pre-Quarter Final	14 June 1997	Integral Coach Factory	3–0
Quarter Final	6 July 1997	Mohammedan Sporting	4–0
Semi Final	13 July 1997	Mohun Bagan	4–1

East Bengal entered the 1997 Indian Federation Cup as the defending champions. In the pre-quarter finals, East Bengal faced Integral Coach Factory and won 3–0 with goals from Naushad Moosa, Renedy Singh and Arumugam Saravanan. In the quarter-finals, East Bengal defeated Mohammedan Sporting 4–0 as Nazimul Haq scored twice, Naushad Moosa and Bhaichung Bhutia scored the other two. In the semi-finals, East Bengal defeated their arch-rivals Mohun Bagan 4–1 in the famous Diamond Derby in front of a record 131,781 crowd at the Salt Lake Stadium. Bhaichung Bhutia scored a hattrick while Nazimul Haq scored the other for East Bengal. Chima Okorie scored the only goal for Bagan as East Bengal reached their fourth consecutive final.

=== Salgaocar ===
Round	Date	Opposition	Score
Pre-Quarter Final	15 June 1997	Mizo Highlanders	6–0
Quarter Final	5 July 1997	Border Security Force	1–1 (4-3 pen)
Semi Final	12 July 1997	Dempo	1–0

Salgaocar entered the 1997 Indian Federation Cup as one of the National League teams. In the pre-quarter finals, Salgaocar defeated Mizo Highlanders 6–0 to reach the last eight of the tournament where they faced Border Security Force. In the quarter-finals, Salgaocar defeated Border Security force 4–3 via penalty shootout after the game ended 1–1 after added extra time. Bruno Coutinho scored for Salgaocar while Prasanta Das had scored for BSF. In the semi-finals, Salgaocar faced the runner-up from the previous edition Dempo and won 1–0 courtesy of a solitary goal from Bruno Coutinho as they reached the final.

== Match ==
=== Details ===
20 July 1997
16:30 IST

East Bengal	1–2 (a.e.t./g.g.)	Salgaocar
Sammy Omollo 83'	Report	Bruno Coutinho 23' 92'

Salt Lake Stadium, Kolkata
Attendance: 100,000 (est.)
Referee: Gulab Chauhan (Gujarat)

East Bengal	Salgaocar

GK	1	(Kenya) Haggi Azande Abulista
RB	17	(India) Ilyas Pasha
CB	2	(India) Naushad Moosa
CB	4	(Kenya) Sammy Omollo
LB	5	(India) Amitabha Chanda	(substituted off) 35'
RM	14	(India) Abdul Sadique
CM	18	(India) Tushar Rakshit (c)
CM	16	(India) Sankarlal Chakraborty
LM	8	(India) Somatai Saiza
ST	15	(India) Bhaichung Bhutia
ST	23	(India) Nazimul Haq	(substituted off) 65'
Substitutes:
LB	20	(India) Falguni Dutta	(substituted on) 35'
CM	6	(India) Shamsi Reza	(substituted on) 65'
Coach:
(India) Monoranjan Bhattacharya

GK	20	(India) Juje Siddi
RB	3	(India) Francis Coelho	(substituted off) 76'
CB	3	(India) Franky Barreto (c)
CB	22	(India) Roberto Fernandes
LB	21	(India) Roque Pereira
LM	6	(India) Shanmugam Venkatesh	(substituted off) 61'
CM	7	(India) Jules Alberto
CM	19	(India) Savio Medeira
RM	16	(India) Domingues Vaz
ST	10	(India) Bruno Coutinho
ST	25	(Nigeria) Jude Odegah	(substituted off) 88'
Substitutes:
LM	23	(India) Sanaton Singh	(substituted on) 61'
FW	8	(India) Gaspah Castro	(substituted on) 88'
Coach:
(India) T.K. Chathunni

Hero of the Match:
Bruno Coutinho (Salgaocar)

Match rules

- 90 minutes.
- 30 minutes of extra time if necessary.
- Golden goal ends game.
- Penalty shoot-out if scores still level.

== See also ==
- 20th "Kalyani Black Label" Federation Cup 1997
