= 1998 Indian Federation Cup qualification =

1998 Federation Cup qualification
Tournament details
- Country: India
- Dates: 18 July–23 August 1998
- Teams: 37

The 1998 Indian Federation Cup qualification tournament was a football competition that was played among 37 teams to determine eight teams that entered the final round. These teams joined eight other teams that automatically qualified by virtue of entering the quarter-finals in the last edition. The qualification matches were played separately in five zones and the winner of each zone qualified automatically; with two from the South Zone. The runners-up of other four Zones competed in playoffs to earn the remaining two spots.

The first qualification match, played on 18 July 1998, was an East Zone match and Jorba Durga from the zone became the first team to qualify. The competition ended 23 August with playoffs when Punjab State Electricity Board eliminated Air India and became the final qualifier.

== Qualified teams ==
Team	Qualified as	Qualified on
Jorba Durga	East Zone winner	22 July
Langsning	North-East Zone winner	1 August
Kochin	South Zone winner	2 August
State Bank of Travancore	South Zone runner-up	2 August
Vasco	West Zone winner	8 August
JCT Mills	North Zone winner	10 August
Tollygunge Agragami	Play-offs winner	20 August
Punjab State Electricity Board	Play-offs winner	23 August

== Qualification ==
=== East Zone ===
==== Semi-finals ====
18 July

Jorba Durga	3–1	Peerless SC

Barabati Stadium, Cuttack

19 July

Tollygunge Agragami	2–0	Tisco, Bihar

Barabati Stadium, Cuttack

==== Final ====
22 July

Jorba Durga	1–0	Tollygunge Agragami

Barabati Stadium, Cuttack

=== North-East Zone ===
==== Quarter-finals ====
24 July

Langsning	3–0	Young Amateurs, Guwahati

25 July

PWD SC, Nagaland	beat	2nd ASRF, Assam

26 July

Bloodmouth, Agartala	beat	AVO, Manipur

27 July

Electric FC, Mizoram	1–0	Eastern Sporting, Mizoram

==== Semi-finals ====
29 July

Langsning	3–1	Electric FC, Mizoram

30 July

Bloodmouth, Agartala	beat	PWD SC, Nagaland

==== Final ====
1 August

Langsning	2–1	Bloodmouth, Agartala

=== South Zone ===
==== Quarter-finals ====
25 July

Integral Coach Factory	2–0	Coaching Centre

Kannur
26 July

State Bank of Travancore	5–2	Hindustan Aeronautics Limited

Kannur

27 July

Kochin	5–2	CIL, Bangalore

Kannur
28 July

Indian Bank	5–1	TG Venkatesh XI

Kannur

==== Semi-finals ====
30 July

Kochin	1–1	Integral Coach Factory

Kannur

31 July

State Bank of Travancore	beat	Indian Bank

Kannur

==== Final ====
2 August

Kochin	2–0	State Bank of Travancore

Kannur

=== West Zone ===
==== Quarter-finals ====
1 August

Air India	2–0	Sporting Union, Bhopal

Yashwant Stadium, Nagpur
2 August

Central Railway	0–1	Immaculate Group, Ahmadebad

Yashwant Stadium, Nagpur

3 August

VLM SC, Goa	5–0	Nivia SC, Kota

Yashwant Stadium, Nagpur
4 August

Vasco	3–0	Renegade, Daman Island

Yashwant Stadium, Nagpur

==== Semi-finals ====
5 August

Air India	1–0	VLM SC, Goa

Yashwant Stadium, Nagpur

6 August

Vasco	2–0	Immaculate Group, Ahmadebad

Yashwant Stadium, Nagpur

==== Final ====
8 August

Vasco	1–0	Air India

Yashwant Stadium, Nagpur

=== North Zone ===
The North Zone section of the 1998 Indian Federation Cup qualification saw nine teams competing for one or two berths in the final tournament. It was held between August 2 and 10 of 1998. One club, JCT Mills qualified for the final tournament and the other, Punjab State Electricity Board, qualified for the play-offs. Post the final game, former footballer Inder Singh was honored by the Chandigarh Football Association.

The qualification process began with nine teams competing for one or two spots. JCT Mills qualified for the final round and Punjab State Electricity Board qualified to play the runners-up of other zones to qualify for the final.

==== Matches ====
===== Qualifying =====
2 August
16:00 IST

Indian Air Force, Delhi	4–1	Haryana State Electricity Board
Jayant Das 44'; Abadath Hossen 59'; Gossen 79'; T. N. Dey 90'	Report	Sanjay Sharma 50'

Sector 17 Stadium, Chandigarh

===== Quarter-finals =====
3 August
16:00 IST

Punjab State Electricity Board	0–6	Himalayan Tigers
Parminder Singh 7', 54'; Gurdish Singh 22'; Kuldip Singh 29'; Kamaljit Singh 57'; Satnam Singh 84'	Report

Sector 17 Stadium, Chandigarh
4 August
16:00 IST

YMCA, Srinagar	0–0 (a.e.t.)	Youngsters Club, Chandigarh
	Report
Penalties
	4–3

Sector 17 Stadium, Chandigarh

5 August
16:00 IST

JCT Mills	1–0	Indian Air Force, Delhi
Jasbir Singh 30'	Report

Sector 17 Stadium, Chandigarh
6 August
16:00 IST

City Club, Delhi	4–2	Sports Hostel, Haldwani
Vimal Thapa 10'; Shyam Kumar 13', 19'; Joy Paul Raj 24'	Report	Jatin Bisht; Rais Ahmed Jafri 88'

Sector 17 Stadium, Chandigarh

===== Semi-finals =====
7 August
16:00 IST

JCT Mills	3–0	YMCA, Srinagar
Harjinder Singh 24' (pen.); Hardip Singh Jr. 35' (??)	Report

Sector 17 Stadium, Chandigarh
Referee: Ramesh Rehani (Delhi)

8 August
16:00 IST

Punjab State Electricity Board	2–0	City Club, Delhi
Parminder Singh	Report

Sector 17 Stadium, Chandigarh

===== Final =====
10 August
16:00 IST

JCT Mills	2–0	Punjab State Electricity Board
Bhupinder Singh 31'; Sanjay Majhi 42'	Report

Sector 17 Stadium, Chandigarh

Baljit Singh
Sukhdev Singh	(substituted off) 53'
Ranjit Singh
Tarsem Lal
Daljit Singh
MF	Hardeep Singh Sr.
Harjinder Singh
Ram Pal
LW	Bhupinder Singh Sr.	(yellow card) 25'
CF	Sanjay Majhi	(substituted off) 57'
Jasbir Singh (c)	(substituted off) 74'
Substitutions:
Charanjeet Singh	(substituted on) 57'
Balbir Singh	(substituted on) 74'
A. Saravanan
FW	Hardip Singh
Coach:
Sukhwinder Singh

GK	Jatinder Singh
MF	Harjinder Singh
	Dalip Kumar
	Manpreet Singh
	Sukhbir Singh
MF	Parminder Singh
	Madan Lal
	Gurvinder Singh
	Gurdish Singh
FW	Sandeep Saini
FW	Kuldip Singh

== Playoffs ==
There were two scheduled playoffs to determine the final two qualification spots to the finals. They were played on 20 and 23 August 1997.

20 August

Bloodmouth, Agartala	0–1	Tollygunge Agragami

Agartala
23 August

Air India	1–2	Punjab State Electricity Board
	Report	Sandip Saini 3'; Parminder Singh

Cooperage Ground, Mumbai

== See also ==
- 1998 Indian Federation Cup
