= East Bengal 4–1 Mohun Bagan =

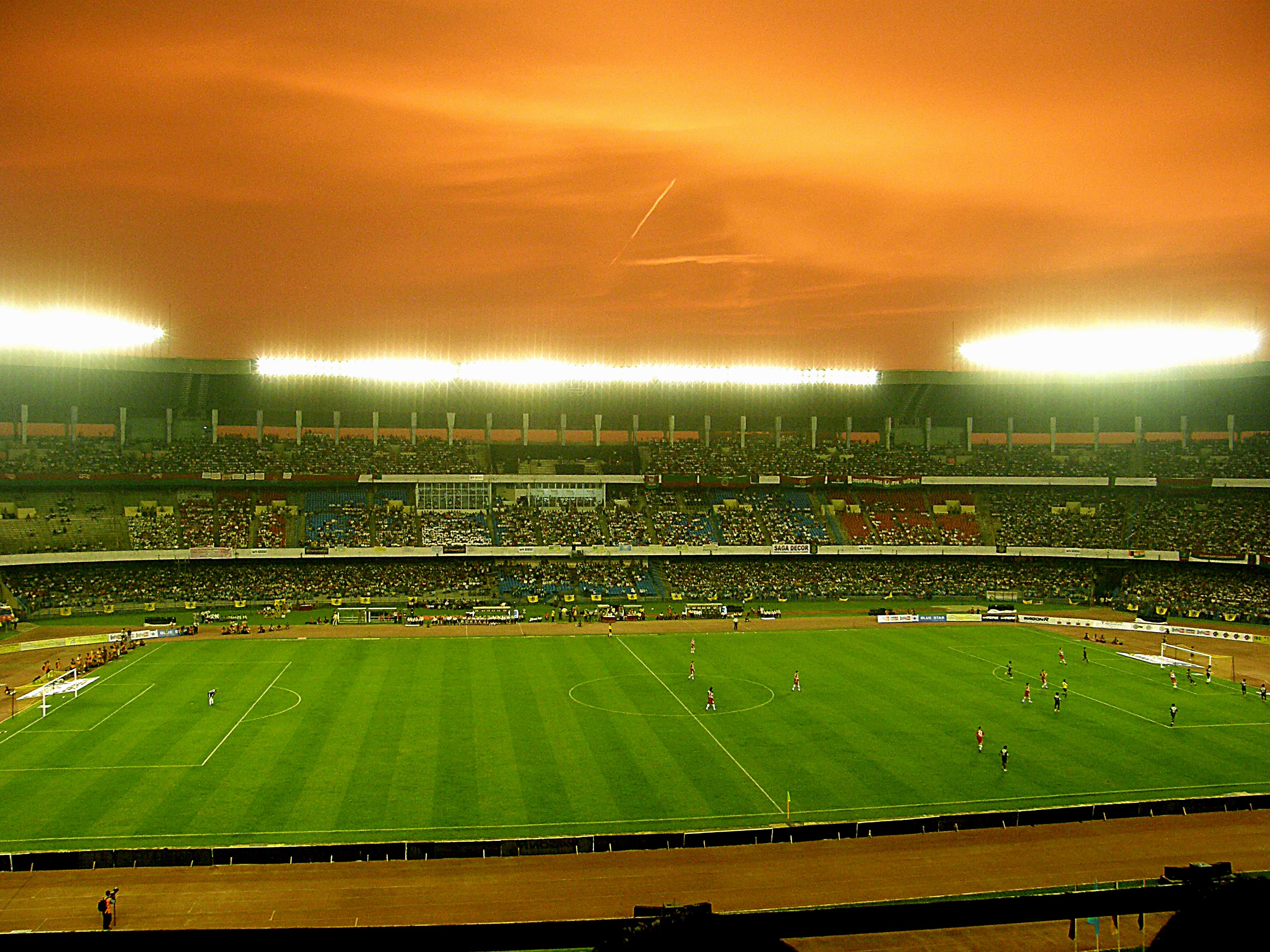
- Salt Lake Stadium, the venue of the match
- Event: 1997 Federation Cup
East Bengal	Mohun Bagan
4	1
- Date: 13 July 1997
- Venue: Salt Lake Stadium, Kolkata
- Man of the Match: Bhaichung Bhutia (East Bengal)
- Referee: Inayatullah Khan (Karnataka)
- Attendance: 1,31,781
- Weather: Haze, 32 °C (90 °F)

The second semi-final of the 1997 Indian Federation Cup was played between arch-rivals East Bengal and Mohun Bagan at Salt Lake Stadium, Kolkata on 13 July 1997. Called the Kolkata Derby, the match was won by East Bengal 4–1 courtesy of a hat-trick, from Bhaichung Bhutia. Nazim-ul-Haque opened the scoring early on for East Bengal before Bhutia's goal took the lead to 2–0. Chima Okorie managed to pull one back for Mohun Bagan in the second half, but Bhutia's twin strikes in four minutes sealed the game for East Bengal.

The coaches of the two teams, Amal Dutta and Pradip Kumar Banerjee, were two of the most well-known coaches in the country, with over two decades of experience with their respective clubs and against each other in IFA Shield, Durand Cup and Calcutta Football League contests. The derby was highly anticipated, as it was the semi-final of one of India's most popular knockout football tournament. Attendance set the Asian record for highest attendance at a sporting event at the time.

== Background ==
The Kolkata Derby is a fixture contested between two football teams from the Kolkata region, Mohun Bagan and East Bengal. Due to historical and cultural factors common to both teams, massive fanbase, and records of successes over decades, the derby had been very popular and closely followed by fans and covered by media, and hence were the two most popular and successful Indian football clubs- East Bengal and Mohun Bagan. Before this fixture, there had been 15 meetings between the two sides in Federation Cups, with the first fixture being held in 1978. In the 15 games played, East Bengal had won four, Mohun Bagan three and eight games ended in draws.

Coaches of Mohun Bagan and East Bengal Amal Dutta and Pradip Kumar Banerjee had seen success as players, and then as coaches from the 1970s well into the 1990s. As coach, Dutta had been known as a 'purist', a 'tactician' and an 'innovator'. Consequently, he had the reputation of winning games with young and lesser known players. His team Mohun Bagan entered the tournament defeating Punjab Police, the winners of North Zone qualifying round, 4–3 in penalties that followed a 1–1 draw on field, in the round of 16, before meeting Churchill Brothers in the quarter-final. Against them he employed the 3–2–3–2 'diamond' formation, a formation that he had introduced in the same year. The formation had seven players often attacking at the same time; Debjit Ghosh was played as a defensive screen while Basudeb Mondal was played as a deep-lying playmaker. Amit Das played just behind Chima Okorie while Abdul Khalique started on the wings and drifted in as the match progressed. With this formation, his team had pulverised Churchill Brothers, beating them 6–0. Dutta had also come to be known for his provocation and trash talk before matches, and before this game had mocked East Bengal's striker Bhutia as "Chung Chung" and dismissed defender Sammy Omollo saying, "I will eat him like an omelette".

The coach of East Bengal, Banerjee, had the reputation as a pragmatist and was known for playing easily adaptable football with popular players to win games, much unlike Dutta. Known for his defensive tactics, which he called the Italian Catenaccio style of play, he regularly fielded 4–3–3 and 4–5–1 formations. He also came to be known for his inspirational pep talk to players termed as "vocal tonic" before games. His team entered the tournament as defending champions and met winners of the South Zone qualifying round, Integral Couch Factory, in the Round of 16. Defeating them 3–0, they met Mohammedan in the quarter-final, who they beat 4–0, to enter the semi-final.

In the fortnight before the game, although East Bengal were yet to beat Mohammedan in the quarter-final on 6 July to earn the right to play Mohun Bagan next, Dutta, and his counterpart, Banerjee, made statements about tactics their teams would adopt for the game. Rediff.com reported: "The atmosphere grew more and more tense as the match day approached. Tickets were sold in black, though the police did its best to dissuade fans from dealing with touts." The derby always drew unprecedented crowds whenever and wherever played, and there had been many instances of violence in the past involving players, team officials and supporters. This led to Dutta appealing for a foreign referee to supervise the game and eventually a FIFA referee, Inayatullah Khan, was called in.

== Match ==
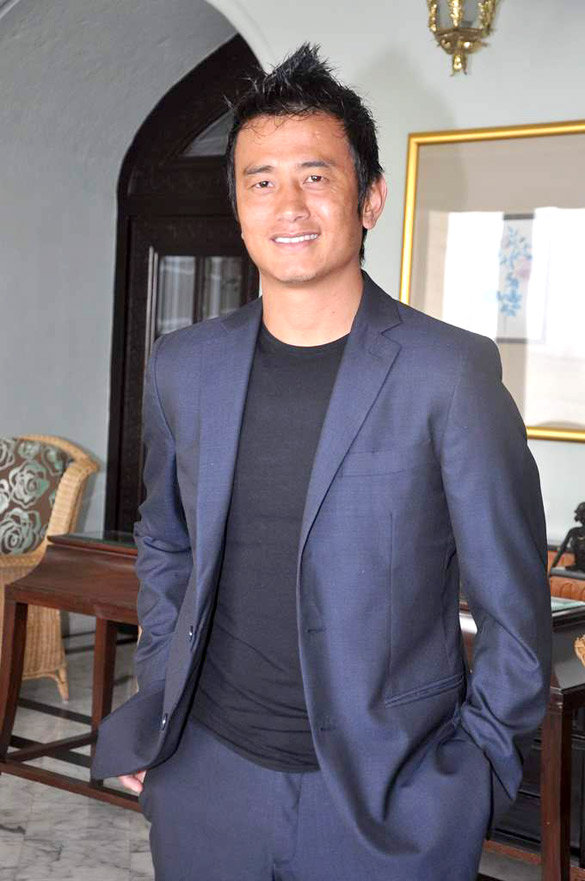
East Bengal's Bhaichung Bhutia, whose hat-trick helped his team win the match.

A record crowd of 131,781 had turned up for the game, over and above the hitherto official seating capacity of 120,000. On the afternoon marked by hot and humid weather conditions, Banerjee made two tactical changes just before the game began. He replaced the defenders, veteran Ilyas Pasha and rookie Falguni Dutta, with the energetic pair of Dulal Biswas and Amitava Chanda. In what was a calculated gamble, he played Haggi Azande Abulista as the goalkeeper, who previously had never played a game of such magnitude. He fielded the 4–4–2 formation to counter Dutta's 3–2–3–2. Another source cites that Dutta employed the 3–4–3 diamond formation.

=== Summary ===
==== First half ====
Mohun Bagan began the game at a brisk pace earning seven corners in the first 25 minutes, but failed to convert any into goal. Chima Okorie and Abdul Khalique frequently swapped positions with Satyajit Chatterjee and Basudeb Mondal picking out their runs with through-passes splitting the defences of East Bengal. East Bengal stood the attacks led by their defender Sammy Omollo who marked Okorie whilst Naushad Moosa worked to minimize the aerial delivery toward the striker. The Bagan players, however, began showing signs of fatigue, as the first half-hour approached. Their defenders, instead of marking Bhaichung Bhutia, attempted to repeatedly trap him offside. He managed to beat the trap that set off a sequence leading to East Bengal's first goal, in the 25th minute. He was deployed slightly towards the flanks with Haque as centre-forward. The Bagan defence made a save at the expense of a corner. Somatai Saiza's kick aimed at Bhutia, bounced off him to hit a Bagan defender and then to an unmarked Haque, who side-volleyed with his left-foot for a goal. The first half thus ended in 1–0 East Bengal's favour.

==== Second half ====
Just a minute into the second half, East Bengal converted another corner kick, again from Saiza's left foot onto Bhutia, who promptly headed it into the bottom right corner of the net taking his team's lead 2–0. Desperate for an equaliser, Bagan began pushing harder, and manifested in the form of an Okorie-goal in the 66th minute. He controlled Mondal's cross, from the right edge of the box, on his chest before volleying it into the net beating East Bengal's goalkeeper to take the scoreline to 1–2 in his team's favour. Exploiting Bagan's poor marking, and positioning of its high line of defence, Bhutia broke the offside trap time and again, speeding past his markers. Haque held on to the ball close to the half line, ran into the Bagan box before passing on for an overlapping Shamsi Reza who crossed over for Bhutia who, in turn, dribbled past a diving defender Ranjan Dey and goalkeeper Dora to find the net's top corner in the 85th minute. Three minutes later, an unchallenged Bhutia ran into the box again and the ball rebounded off opponent midfielder Satyajit Chatterjee's feet as he tried to intercept Bhutia's pass to Haque. Bhutia tapped it home to complete his hat-trick and the scoreline showed 4–1 at full-time.

=== Details ===
13 July 1997

East Bengal	4–1	Mohun Bagan
Haque 25'; Bhutia 46', 85', 88'	Report	Okorie 66'

Salt Lake Stadium, Kolkata
Attendance: 1,31,781
Referee: Inayatullah Khan (Karnataka)

East Bengal	Mohun Bagan

GK	1	(Kenya) Haggi Azande Abulista
RB	12	(India) Dulal Biswas (c)		(substituted off) 71'
CB	4	(Kenya) Sammy Omollo
CB	2	(India) Naushad Moosa
LB	5	(India) Amitava Chanda
CM	16	(India) Sankarlal Chakraborty
MF	18	(India) Tushar Rakshit
MF	8	(India) Somatai Saiza		(substituted off) 67'
RW	23	(India) Nazimul Haque
MF	14	(India) Abdul Sadiqe	(yellow card) 77'
CF	15	(India) Bhaichung Bhutia
Substitutes:
GK	22	(India) Kalyan Chaubey
FW	6	(India) Shamsi Reza		(substituted on) 67'
DF		(India) Ilyas Pasha
DF	20	(India) Phalguni Dutta		(substituted on) 71'
Coach:
(India) Pradip Kumar Banerjee

GK	21	(India) Hemanta Dora
LB	23	(India) James Odhiambo
CB	3	(India) Aloke Das (c)
CB	16	(India) Ranjan Dey
DF	4	(India) Debjit Ghosh
MF	14	(India) Basudeb Mondal
CM	24	(India) Satyajit Chatterjee
LW	19	(India) Lolendra Singh	(substituted off) 70'
MF	8	(India) Amit Das
ST	22	(Nigeria) Chima Okorie
ST	11	(India) Abdul Khalique
Substitutes:
MF	7	(India) Soumitra Chakraborty	(substituted on) 70'
Coach:
(India) Amal Dutta

Man of the match

- Bhaichung Bhutia (East Bengal)

Match officials

- Assistant referees:
  - Michael Andrews (Kerala)
  - R. D. Sow (Madhya Pradesh)

Match rules

- 90 minutes.
- 30 minutes of extra time if necessary.
- Penalty shoot-out if scores still level.

== Aftermath ==
The match took place on the back of dwindling numbers of supporters at games in Kolkata and the press writing football off among Indians in terms of interest. However, the impact this game had had, was described by India Today thus: "A city and a sport rediscovered each other and Calcutta and soccer were locked again in a bizarre tango" and added, "It was the '60s and '70s revisited: it was mayhem, it was stirring." The author also writes about how management of Mohun Bagan went for a more "telegenic" design of their team's jersey giving up a 119-year-old tradition of wearing "dull jerseys", upon the request of ESPN, whose subsidiary television channel Star Sports telecast the game. The game was also telecast live by Doordarshan, the government funded broadcaster, which was significant in that, the only sport of which games was telecast live was cricket, owing to its popularity in the country.

Speaking of the game, Bhutia said, "It was a great feeling to score a hat-trick on such a big occasion and it's true that it gave me a lot of media attention but I had to work even harder after that. For me you are only as good as your last game so I had to start from scratch again from the next match." Despite the failure of his 'diamond' formation in the game, Dutta, however, went on with it, and was able to exact "revenge" in a replay of the match within a month, when his team beat East Bengal 1–0 at the final of the Calcutta Football League.
