= List of localities in Nagpur =

Nagpur has a population of 4.6 million. It is the 13th largest urban agglomeration in India, according to figures from the 2001 census of India.

Localities:

1. Mahal — The oldest locality in Nagpur. Nagpur was founded here by Raja Bakht Buland Shah. The Bhonsle Rajwada is also located here.
2. Sitabuldi
3. Ganesh Peth colony
4. Dhantoli
5. Trimurti Nagar
6. Itwari
7. Mominpura
8. Dharampeth
9. Ramdaspeth
10. Shraddhanand Peth
11. Sadar
12. Civil Lines
13. Chinchbhuvan
14. Gandhibagh
15. Nandanvan
16. Kalamna
17. Wardhaman Nagar
18. Seminary Hills
19. Police Line Takli
20. Mankapur
21. Pachpaoli
22. Vayusena Nagar
23. Ravi Nagar
24. Byramji Town
25. Chaoni
26. Mangalwari
27. Gaddi Godam
28. Gitti Khadan
29. Pratap Nagar
30. Ajni
31. Pardi
32. durganagar
33. Indora
34. Pili Nadi
35. Yashodhara Nagar
36. Friends Colony
37. Maskasath
38. Jaitala
39. Jaripatka
40. Kapil Nagar
41. Ashok Nagar
42. Gokulpeth
43. Giripeth
44. Bajaj Nagar
45. Rajendra Nagar
46. Lakadganj
47. Gandhinagar
48. Manish Nagar
49. Bezanbagh
50. Bhandewadi
51. Rahate Colony
52. New Pawan Shakti Nagar
53. Jafar Nagar
54. Friends Colony
55. Baba Farid Nagar
56. Suyog Nagar
57. Sahyog Nagar
