= Ganesh Peth, Nagpur =

Ganesh Peth Colony
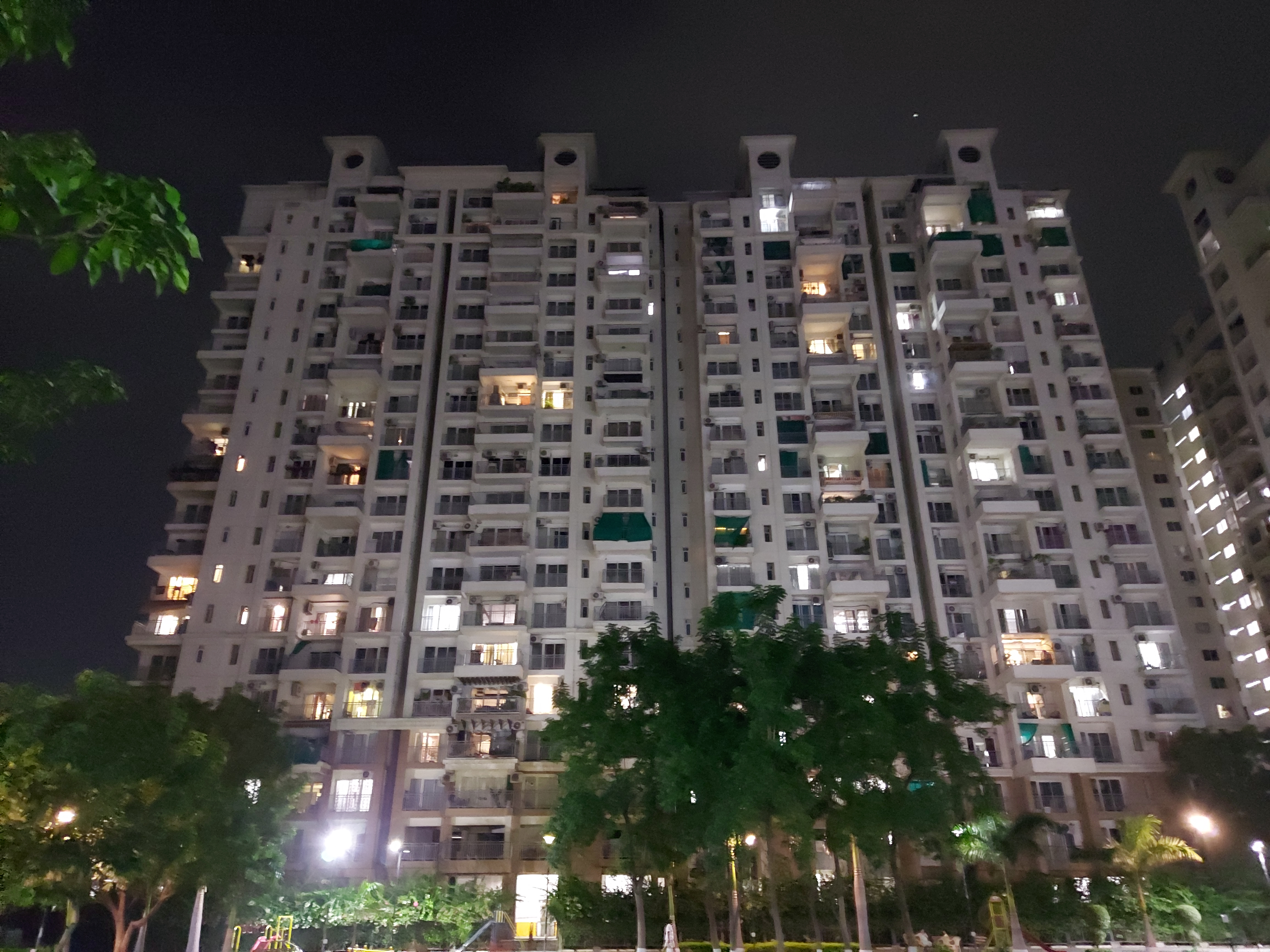
- Godrej Anandam, the tallest building in Ganesh peth.

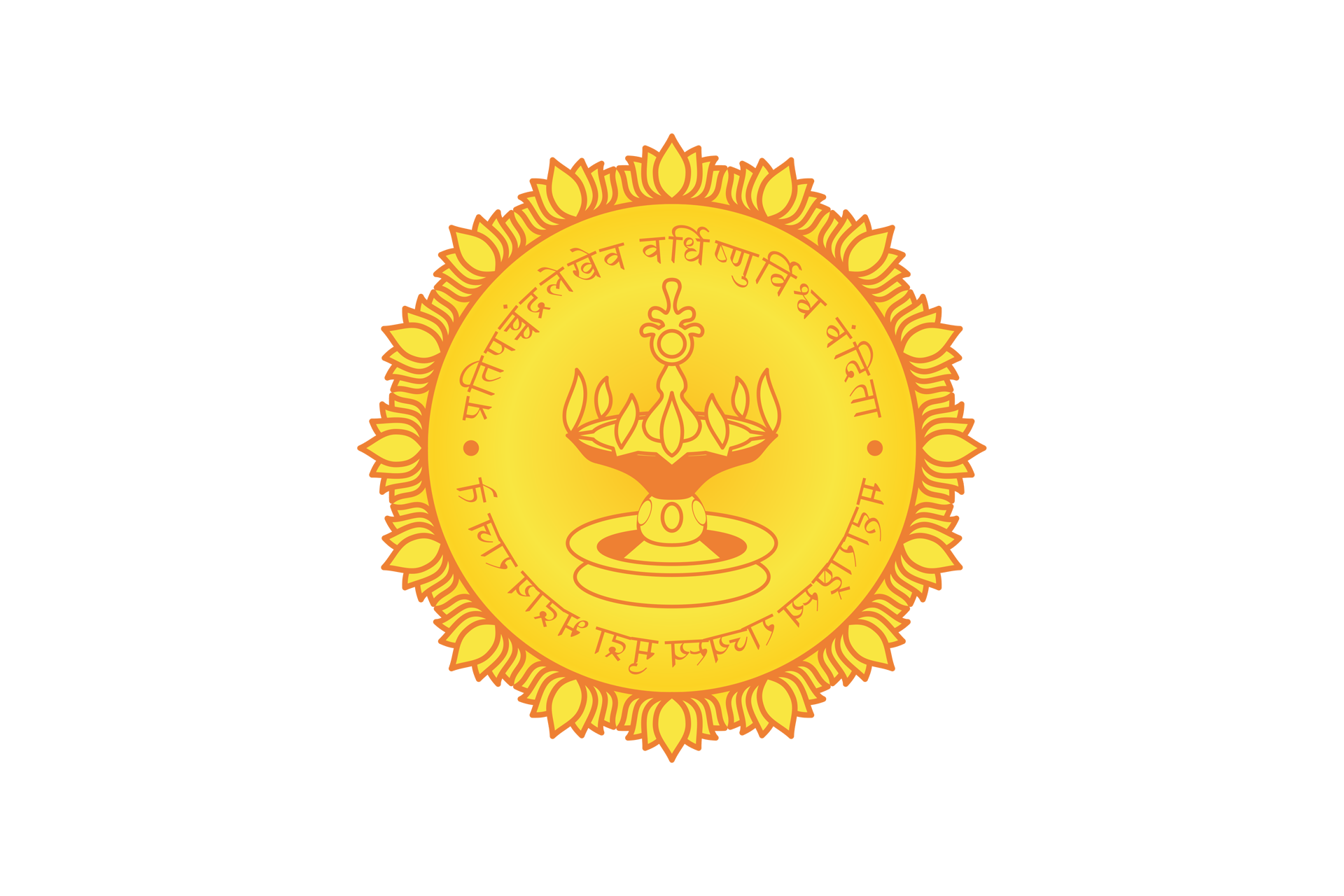
- Emblem of Maharashtra

- Map showing Ganeshpeth Colony in Nagpur, Maharashtra
- Coordinates: 21.1403°N 79.0959°E
- Country: India
- State: Maharashtra
- District: Nagpur city district
- City: Nagpur
- Region: Vidarbh Region

Government
  - Type: Municipal Corporation
  - Body: Nagpur Municipal Corporation (NMC)

Area
  - Total: 1.54 km^{2} (0.59 sq mi)
- Elevation: 314 m (1,030 ft)

Population (2020)
  - Total: 37,431 people
  - Density: 24,383/km^{2} (63,150/sq mi)

Languages
  - Official: Marathi
- Time zone: UTC+5:30 (IST)
- PIN: 440018
- Area code: 0712
- Civic Agency: Nagpur Municipal Corporation (NMC)

Ganesh Peth or Ganesh Peth Colony is a locality based in the city district of Nagpur, Maharashtra. It belongs to Vidarbh region of the Nagpur Division and is close to some destinations in Nagpur like the ST (State Transport) Stand Square, Shukrwari Lake and Ramwadi. The colony also has one of the tallest buildings in Nagpur, called the Godrej Anandam. The colony also has its own police station unlike other localities. The Ganesh Peth police station is just situated at a walkable distance from the colony.

== Population and demographics ==
Ganesh Peth covers and area about nearly 1.54 km^{2} (0.59 sq mi) with a total population of nearly 37,431 people. Ganesh peth also has a population density of about 24,383 inhabitants per square kilometre (63,150/sq mi) with a male population of about 19,067 males and a female population of about 18,364 females as of 2020.

== Nearby areas ==
Ganesh Peth Colony is 1.36 Km away from Hanuman Nagar, 1.62 Km from Mahal,1.72 Km from Sitabuldi, 1.82 Km from Gandhibagh and 2.54 Km from Reshim Bagh. Sampriti Nagar and Vanjari are some popular nearby areas to the colony.

== Nearest airport and railway station ==
The nearest airport from Ganesh Peth Colony is nearly 5.88 km (3.65 mi) away from it which is the Nagpur International Airport and the nearest railway station, Nagpur Moti Bagh Railway station, is nearly 0.79 km (0.49 mi) away.
