= Dhantoli =

Neighborhood in central Nagpur, Maharashtra, India

Coordinates: 21°08′N 79°05′E

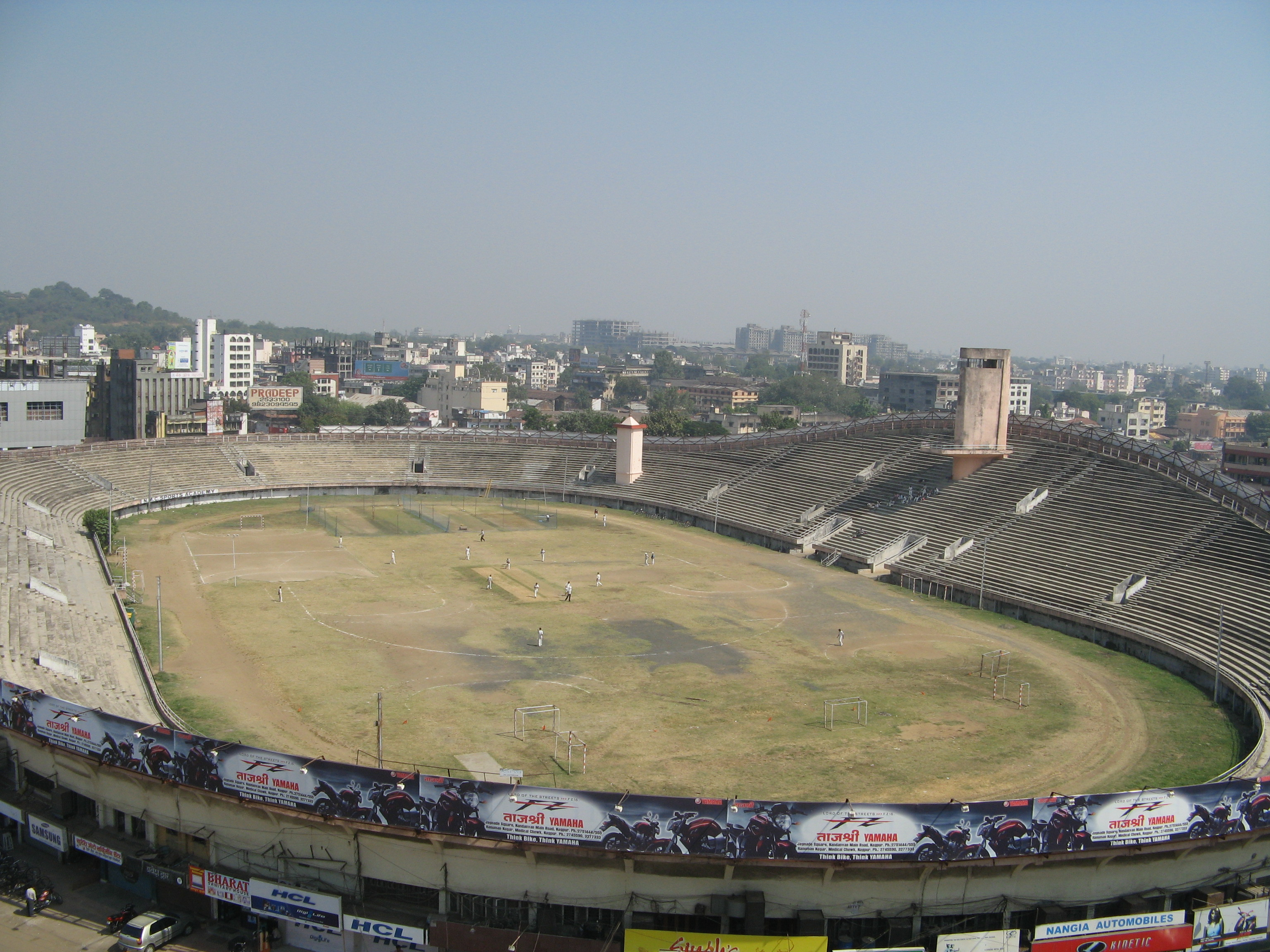
Yashwant Stadium in Dhantoli

Dhantoli (Marathi : धंतोली) is a prominent neighborhood located in central Nagpur, Maharashtra, India. Historically, it served as the residence of the Treasurer of the Raja of Nagpur and home to a significant population of Marathi Brahmins. Over the years, Dhantoli has evolved into a densely populated urban area known for its healthcare facilities and historical landmarks and for being in the vicinity of fast-growing Nagpur and the international airport.

== Healthcare and protests ==
Dhantoli is known for its numerous healthcare facilities, including hospitals and clinics. Located on Dr. Khare Marg, Dhantoli. Known for pediatric and general care. Several clinics and hospitals offering specialties Like cardiology, heart institutes, orthopaedics, MRI scan etc. are available,

The concentration of healthcare establishments has raised concerns about urban congestion, leading to public protests in 2013 over infrastructure and zoning issues.

== Sports and recreation ==
Dhantoli is home to Yashwant Stadium, one of the oldest stadiums in Nagpur. Historically a centre for sporting events, the stadiums are now primarily used as a marketplace for local vendors.

Another significant recreational site area is Patwardhan Grounds, which hosts various public events, including exhibitions and circuses, serving as a cultural gathering point.

=== Events ===
Yashwant Stadium hosts the Nagpur Premier League football matches annually, as well as cultural programs from schools, colleges, and other associations
