= Ilyas Pasha =

Indian footballer (1964–2026)

Ilyas Pasha (1964 – 22 January 2026) was an Indian footballer who played for East Bengal FC and captained the team during 1993–94 season. He was a dependable right wing back and earned eight caps for the senior Indian team.

== Career ==
Pasha was from Karnataka. He made his debut for the India national team on 27 January 1987, against Bulgaria in the Nehru Cup at Kozhikode. His eight appearances for India include two Nehru Cup tournaments in 1987 and 1991, the 1991 SAF Games and the 1992 Asian Cup qualifiers.

He began with a local Bengaluru outfit, Vinayaka Football Club in Vyalikaval and earned a spot in the Indian Telephone Industries team in the mid-1980s that helped him rise to the national stage. He played for Karnataka in the Santosh Trophy tournament from 1987. He played for his home state, Karnataka, at Kolkata in 1987, Quilon (now Kollam) in 1988, and Guwahati in 1989. Later, he earned two Santosh Trophy titles with Bengal in 1993 and 1995. In 1989, he played for Mohammedan Sporting club team which won the Sait Nagjee Trophy and the Nizam Gold Cup. Later, he moved to East Bengal, for whom he played for a long time. He captained the red and gold brigade in the 1993–94 season under coach Subhash Bhowmick.

He was part of the East Bengal team which won the Calcutta Football League five times in 1991, 1993, 1995, 1996, 1998 and the IFA Shield, also five times in 1990, 1991, 1994, 1995, 1997. He also won four Durand Cup titles with East Bengal in 1990, 1991, 1993, 1995.

East Bengal won a triple crown in 1990 and he was the skipper of their first international title at the Wai Wai Cup in 1993. He also led East Bengal in their 6–2 win against Iraq's Al-Zawraa in the 1993–94 Asian Cup Winners' Cup.

== Death ==
After a prolonged illness, Pasha succumbed to cancer on 22 January 2026, at the age of 61. He was survived by his wife, two daughters and two sons. His death was condoled by the All India Football Federation and the Bangalore District Football Association.

== Awards ==
- In 2012, Pasha received a Lifetime Achievement Award from East Bengal.
