= Shukrawari Lake =

Lake in Nagpur, India

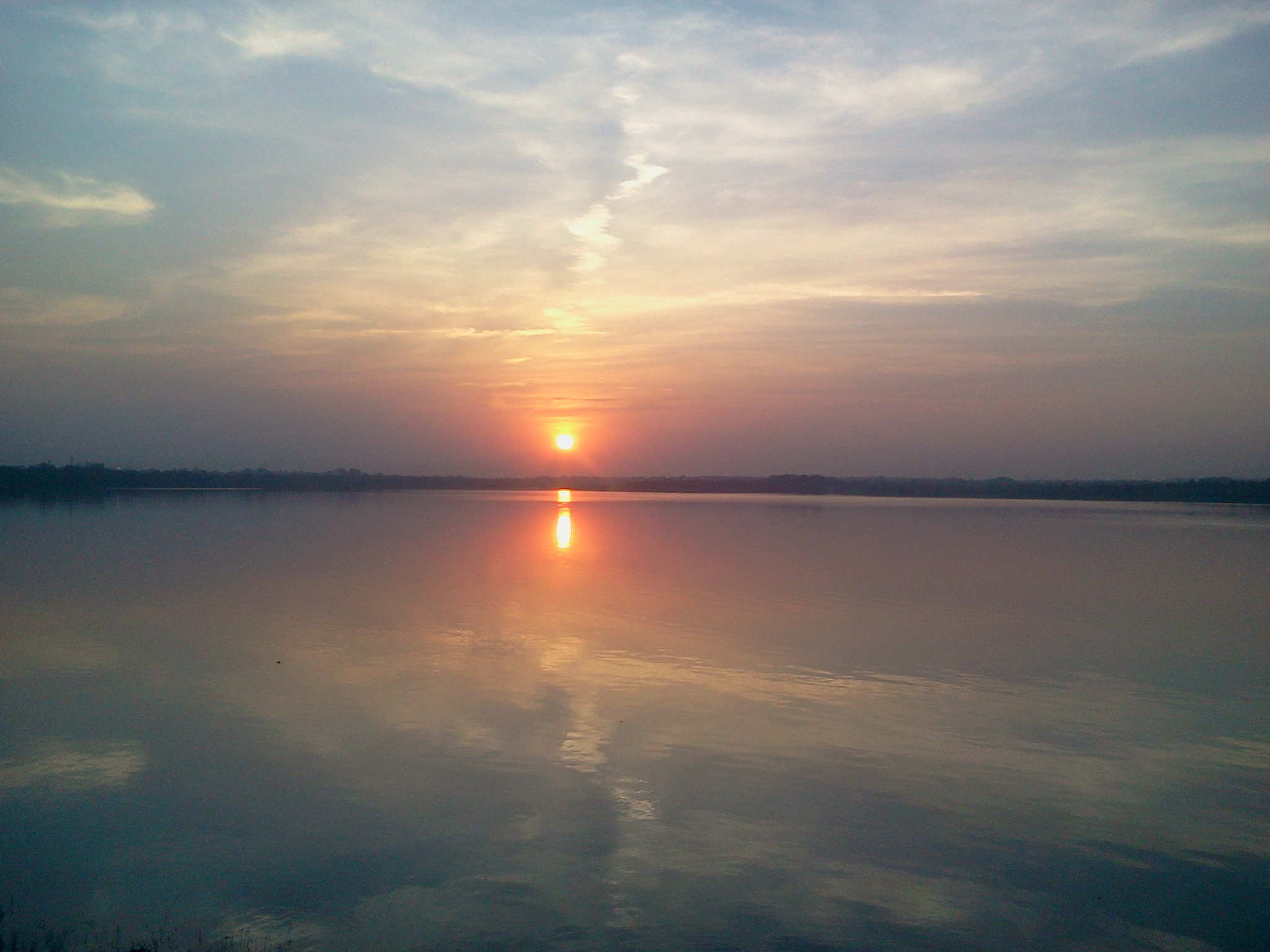
- Shukravari Lake at Sunset

- Location within India
- Location: Nagpur
- Coordinates: 21.146°N 79.099°E

Shukrawari Lake is a lake in Nagpur, located in front of the Raman Science Centre. It is also known by the names Shukravari Talao (lake), Gandhi Sagar Lake and Jumma lake.

The lake is said to have been established as a source of water for Nagpur more than 275 years ago by Chand Sultan, the ruler of Nagpur at the time. He created the lake by having streams diverted to the Nag River, which was connected to the water reservoir and named 'Jumma Talab'. Subsequently, it came to be known as 'Shukrawari Talao' during the Bhonsla and British periods when Raghuji I declared Nagpur as the capital of his domain in 1742.

Currently, the reservoir is enclosed with stonewalls and iron railings. There is a small island in the middle of the lake, a garden known locally as the spoon garden, a temple of Shiva and a garden illuminated with yellow mercury light at night.
