= Bruno Coutinho (footballer, born 1969) =

Indian footballer (born 1969)

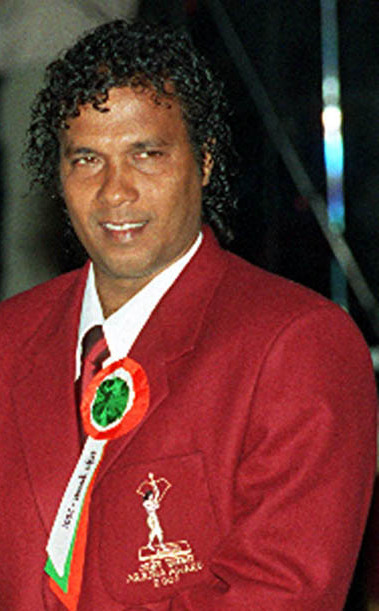
- Coutinho at Rashtrapati Bhavan, 2002

Personal information
- Date of birth: 6 October 1969 (age 57)
- Place of birth: Panjim, Goa, India
- Position: Forward

Senior career*
Years	Team	Apps	(Gls)
- Salgaocar
- Dempo

International career
- India
- * Club domestic league appearances and goals

Bruno Coutinho (born 6 October 1969) is an Indian former football player. He spent most of his club career in Salgaocar FC. Coutinho is a recipient of the Arjuna Award in 2001, a national Indian award for excellence in sport.

== Early life ==
Coutinho studied in Monte De Guirim in Guirim, Goa, where he was recognized by coach Paul Raj. He played his first game against school rivals St. Pilar, scoring three goals and winning the Subroto Mukerjee Cup Football Tournament for U17.

== Club career ==
Coutinho has also been a former Indian football captain. His much-watched career has spanned nearly a decade-and-half. He first played for India at a school tournament at Brunei in 1987. He started his senior club career with Dempo Engineering in 1988, before moving to Salgaocar SC in 1989.

Bruno is credited with helping Salgaocar win the Federation Cup in 1987, the Rovers Cup in 1989 and 1996, the Taca Goa in 1989 and the 1998 National Football League in India. Coutinho was the All India Football Federation player of the year when he played for Salgaocar Sports Club of Goa in the year 1996.

=== 2002 club transfer ===
In August 2002 it was reported that Coutinho was transferring from his traditional Salgaocar Sports Club to the Vasco Sports Club. Both clubs are located in Goa. In 2003 he became a coach.

== International career ==
Coutinho has been called a "diminutive striker". His international debut came in 1989–90, and his last match for India was in the Millennium Cup in 2001. Among Coutinho's other achievements are representing India in the President's Cup in 1989 in Dhaka, heading the Indian Under-23 team for the 1991 pre-Olympics, for the SAF Games in 1995 and 1996 and the Asia Cup in Malaysia.

== Personal life ==
Coutinho is married and has two children.

== Honours ==
India

- SAFF Championship: 1997, 1999; runner-up: 1995
- South Asian Games Gold medal: 1995; Bronze medal: 1999

Salgaocar

- Federation Cup: 1997

Individual

- AIFF Player of the Year: 1996
- Arjuna Award: 2001
