= Satyajit Chatterjee =

Indian former footballer and coach

Satyjit Chatterjee সত্যজিৎ চ্যাটার্জি
- Satyajit Chatterjee (left) with Mohun Bagan coach Carlos Periera.

Personal information
- Full name: Satyajit Chatterjee
- Place of birth: Bally, West Bengal, India
- Position: Midfielder
Medal record
Men's football
Representing India
South Asian Games
Gold medal – first place	1987 Kolkata	Team competition
Bronze medal – third place	1989 Islamabad	Team competition

Satyajit Chatterjee is an Indian former footballer and coach, who captained Mohun Bagan and represented India internationally. He served as India Captain in the year 1991. He also became the captain of bengal team and Mohun Bagan team. He has served Mohun Bagan for 14 years at a stretch. Chatterjee also is the highest goal scorer in the derby matches. He is currently the assistant general secretary of Mohun Bagan. He became the general secretary of Mohun Bagan for a very brief period of time.

He was born in Bally in the Howrah district of West Bengal. A Bengali Brahmin from Howrah with his roots from a small town, Bally. At the age of seven or eight, his interests and talent in football came to notice by his grandfather and uncles. Growing up in a joint family he got the guidance well, specially by his grandfather Kartick Chandra Chattopadhyay, a well known football player of his time and his youngest uncle Krishna Kamal Chattopadhyay, who played in teams like Kumortuli, Bally pratibha and Calcutta Gymkhana. Chatterjee is the middle child with an elder brother and a younger brother & sister. Satyajit Chatterjee is popularly known as Bubun amongst his family and friends. He largely avoided classroom and preferred to play football day and night.

== Career ==
=== Playing career ===
Chatterjee appeared with Calcutta Football League club George Telegraph, before signing with Mohun Bagan. He played for Mohun Bagan for fifteen consecutive years from 1986 to 2000, and captained the team in 1990. With "the mariners", he played alongside players like Krishanu Dey and Chima Okorie.

He has also represented India internationally.

=== Coaching career ===
The holder of an AFC "C" coaching licence holder, Chatterjee has worked as an assistant coach to Carlos Pereira, Karim Bencherifa and Amal Dutta.

After coaching Mohun Bagan for a friendly against Bayern Munich, a testimonial match for Oliver Kahn held in Salt Lake Stadium, he had a short stint as the club's head coach in 2009–10 season, before resigning from the job taking the responsibility for the club's poor performance.

=== Administrative career ===
In 2015, Chatterjee fought for the post of football secretary in Mohun Bagan club election and defeated Subrata Bhattacharya with more than 2000 votes.

== Honours ==
Mohun Bagan

- National Football League: 1997–98, 1999–2000.
- Federation Cup: 1986, 1987, 1992, 1993, 1994, 1998.
- Calcutta Football League: 1986, 1990, 1992, 1994, 1997.
- IFA Shield: 1987, 1989, 1998, 1999.
- Durand Cup: 1986, 1994, 2000.
- Rovers Cup: 1988, 1991, 1992, 2000.
- Sikkim Governor's Gold Cup: 1986, 1989, 1991, 1992, 1994, 2000.
- Bordoloi Trophy: 1996.
- All Airlines Gold Cup: 1989, 1991, 1993, 2000.
- McDowell's Cup: 1996, 1999
- DCM Trophy: 1997

India

- South Asian Games Gold medal: 1987; Bronze medal: 1989

Individual

- Mohun Bagan Ratna Award: 2001
