= Yashwant Stadium =

Football stadium in Nagpur, India

Coordinates: 21°08′20.9″N 79°04′53.8″E

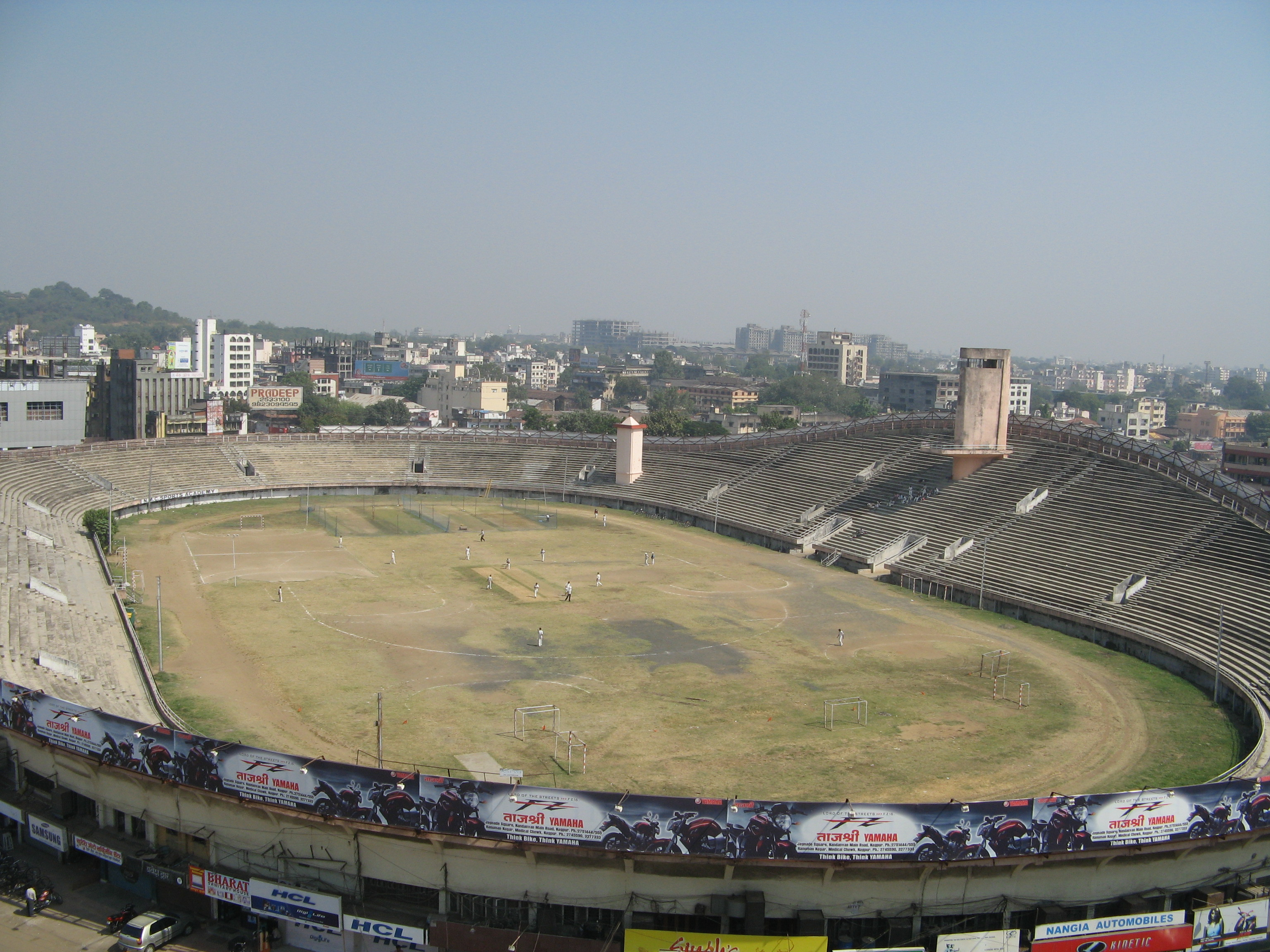
- Interactive map of Yashwant Stadium
- Full name: Yashwant Stadium
- Location: Nagpur, India
- Capacity: 30,000

Construction
- Renovated: 2012

Yashwant Stadium is a football stadium in Nagpur, India. It has a maximum seating capacity of 30,000 and a maximum standing capacity of 50,000. It hosted Nagpur Premier League football matches in front of capacity crowds.

A redevelopment of the stadium is planned. The redevelopment is planned on the lines with the EKA Arena in Ahmedabad.
