= 1997 Indian Federation Cup =

20th edition of the Federation Cup

1997 Federation Cup
Kalyani Black Label Federation Cup

Tournament details
- Country: India
- Teams: 16

Final positions
- Champions: Salgaocar (3rd title)
- Runners-up: East Bengal
- Asian Cup Winners' Cup: Salgaocar

Tournament statistics
- Matches played: 16
- Goals scored: 49 (3.06 per match)
- Top goal scorer(s): Bruno Coutinho; Chima Okorie (8 goals each)

Awards
- Best player: Bruno Coutinho

The 1997 Indian Federation Cup (also known as 1997 Kalyani Black Label Federation Cup due to sponsorship reasons) was the 20th season of the Indian Federation Cup. The tournament was held between 14 June and 20 July 1997. It was won by Salgaocar, who beat defending champions East Bengal 2–1 in the final. Salgaocar's captain Bruno Coutinho was named player of the tournament.

== Pre-quarterfinals ==
14 June

Mohammedan	1–1 (a.e.t.)	Kerala Police
Majhi 90'	Report	Pappachan 3'
Penalties
Debashis Hazra (penalty scored); Senapati (penalty scored); Cassius Owino (penalty scored); Subir Ghosh (penalty scored); Amitav Ghosh (penalty missed); Arpan Dey (penalty scored); Ohidul Islam (penalty scored)	6–5	Sreenivasan (penalty scored); Edison (penalty scored); Pushparaj (penalty scored); Asokan (penalty scored); Mathew (penalty missed); Sasi (penalty scored); Pappachan (penalty missed)

Bangalore Football Stadium, Bangalore
14 June

East Bengal	3–0	Integral Coach Factory
Moosa 57'; R. Singh 61'; Saravanan 69'	Report

Salt Lake Stadium, Kolkata
15 June

Border Security Force	2–0	Marmagao Port Trust
Das 10'; Mahato 68'	Report

Bangalore Football Stadium, Bangalore
15 June

Salgaocar	6–0	Mizo Highlanders

17 June

Mohun Bagan	1–1 (a.e.t.)	Punjab Police
Mondal 20'	Report	Kumar 55'
Penalties
Singh (penalty scored); Devinder Singh (penalty scored); Swaran Singh (penalty scored); Harnek Singh (penalty missed); Buta Singh (penalty missed)	4–3	Das (penalty scored); Okorie (penalty scored); Chatterjee (penalty scored); Dora (penalty scored); Ranjan Mazhi (penalty missed)

Bangalore Football Stadium, Bangalore
18 June

Eastern Railway	0–2	ITI SC
	Report	Kenneth Raj 74', 88'

Bangalore Football Stadium, Bangalore
Referee: M. Sreedharan (Tamil Nadu)
21 June

Dempo	2–0	SBI Travancore
Meetei 10'; Silviera 80'	Report

Lal Bahadur Shastri Stadium, Hyderabad
22 June

Churchill Brothers	1–1 (a.e.t.)	JCT Mills
Kumar		Jasbir Singh 36'
Penalties
	3–1

== Quarter-finals ==
29 June

Mohun Bagan	6–0	Churchill Brothers
Mondal 36'; Okorie 43', 47', 73', 83'; Khalique 75'	Report

Nehru Stadium, Guwahati
5 July

Salgaocar	1–1 (a.e.t.)	BSF FT
Coutinho 45'	Report	Das 27'
Penalties
Jules Alberto (penalty scored); Coutinho (penalty scored); Venkatesh (penalty scored); Robert Fernandes (penalty scored)	4–3	Raghubir Singh (penalty scored); Pradip Gorai (penalty scored); Abay Mohato (penalty scored); Avtar Singh (penalty missed)

Lal Bahadur Shastri Stadium, Hyderabad

6 July

East Bengal	4–0	Mohammedan
Haque 4' (?); Moosa 20' (pen.); Bhutia 26'	Report

Salt Lake Stadium, Kolkata
Referee: Bosco Pereira
9 July

ITI SC	1–2	Dempo
Sudhakar 26'	Report	Soares 6'; Ribeiro 21'

Lal Bahadur Shastri Stadium, Hyderabad

== Semi-finals ==
12 July

Salgaocar	1–0	Dempo

13 July

East Bengal	4–1	Mohun Bagan
Haque 25'; Bhutia 46', 85', 88'	Report	Okorie 66'

Salt Lake Stadium, Kolkata
Attendance: 131,781
Referee: Inayatullah Khan (Karnataka)

== Third place play-off ==
15 July

Mohun Bagan	3–1	Dempo
Khalique 11', 70'; Okorie 52'	Report	Soares 62'

Nehru Stadium, Guwahati

== Final ==
20 July

East Bengal	1–2 (a.e.t.)	Salgaocar
Omollo 83'	Report	Coutinho 23', 92'

Salt Lake Stadium, Kolkata
