= Chima Okorie =

Nigerian footballer (born 1968)

Personal information
- Full name: Chima Ephraim Okorie
- Date of birth: 8 October 1968 (age 58)
- Place of birth: Izomber, Imo State, Nigeria
- Position: Forward

Senior career*
Years	Team	Apps	(Gls)
1984–1985	Chandigarh Football Club		
1985–1987	Kolkata Mohammedan		(54)
1986	Abahani Krira Chakra	1	(0)
1987–1990	East Bengal		(122)
1988	Dhaka Mohammedan		
1991–1993	Mohun Bagan		(114)
1993	Peterborough United	5	(0)
1993–1994	Grimsby Town	5	(1)
1994–1995	Torquay United	14	(5)
1995	Sogndal	9	(1)
1995–1996	Ikast FS	3	(0)
1996–1997	Viborg FF		
1997–1999	Mohun Bagan		
2001–2002	Bengal-Mumbai FC		
- * Club domestic league appearances and goals

Chima Ephraim Okorie (//; born 8 October 1968 in Izomber, Abia State) is a Nigerian former professional football striker who was renowned for his goalscoring prowess in the Indian leagues. He went on to score 131 goals for East Bengal in three seasons, becoming the top scorer in the history of East Bengal crossing K. P. Dhanaraj who had 127 goals, until it was crossed by Bhaichung Bhutia.

== Playing career ==
Okorie moved to India as a student, his big break came when he played first time in the Durand Cup, when he represented Visakhapatnam and Hyderabad XI. There was no such thing as Chandigarh team was an all volunteer team and could not afford to pay their players. He then signed a major deal with Kolkata Mohammedan, East Bengal and Mohun Bagan. With Mohammedan, he scored sixteen goals in 1985 CFL season.

In 1986, he signed for Bangladeshi club Abahani Krira Chakra for a crucial Dhaka Derby match to decide the Dhaka First Division League champions. However, after suffering a 2–0 defeat, he returned to India.

An incident involving Chima led to intervention from FIFA in Bangladeshi football. The intense rivalry between Abahani and Dhaka Mohammedan over Chima during the 1988-89 First Division League season saw both clubs vying to include him in their squad for the highly anticipated Dhaka derby. Chima was accused of accepting money from Abahani while signing for Mohammedan. Despite Abahani’s strong objections, he took the field for Mohammedan against them, sparking FIFA’s anger. As a result, Bangladesh faced the risk of an international football ban.

He captained East Bengal in 1990–91. He was received praise for his playing style as a forward He is also the first foreign player in Mohun Bagan. He then moved to England, firstly having an unsuccessful trial at Sunderland before joining Peterborough United on non-contract terms before joining Grimsby Town in September 1993.

He made his English league debut as a substitute away to Crystal Palace winning the Sunday Man of the match, and made four further appearances (all as a substitute) as his career at Grimsby was interrupted by a broken leg. He moved to Torquay United in March 1994 and was a regular in the Torquay side for the next twelve months, before losing his place to Duane Darby.

He was released at the end of the 1994–95 season was joined Norwegian second-tier side Sogndal, later playing for Danish premier sides Ikast FS and Viborg FF. He returned to India to play again for Mohun Bagan, but received a two-year suspension after being accused of assaulting a referee in a game on 31 August 1999.

In 2001, he came back to India and signed with Bengal Mumbai FC. He appeared in few matches of Mumbai Senior Division with BMFC.

== Managerial career ==
On 3 June 2006, he was made manager of Bengal-Mumbai FC, and also became the club's CEO on 16 August. He was appointed manager of Mohun Bagan on 20 February 2007, but resigned on 7 April following differences with the club's senior players. He then became the manager of the Delhi based I-League 2nd division side Osian's New Delhi Heroes.

== Honours ==
=== Individual ===
- Calcutta Football League Top Scorer: 1987 (26 goals), 1991 (11 goals)

== See also ==
- List of foreign players for SC East Bengal

== Bibliography ==
- Sen, Dwaipayan (2013). "Wiping the Stain Off the Field of Plassey: Mohun Bagan in 1911". In Bandyopadhyay, Kausik; Mallick, Sabyasachi (eds.). Fringe Nations in World Soccer. Routledge. ISBN 978-1-317-99810-5.
- Sen, Ronojoy (2015). "The Empire Strikes Back: The 1911 IFA Shield and Football in Calcutta". Nation at Play: A History of Sport in India. Columbia University Press. ISBN 978-0-231-16490-0.
- Kapadia, Novy (2017). Barefoot to Boots: The Many Lives of Indian Football. Penguin Random House. ISBN 978-0-143-42641-7.
- Mukhopadhay, Subir (2018). সোনায় লেখা ইতিহাসে মোহনবাগান (transl. Mohun Bagan in the history written in gold). ISBN 978-93-850172-0-9.
- Banerjee, Argha; Basu, Rupak (2022). মোহনবাগান: সবুজ ঘাসের মেরুন গল্প (transl. Mohun Bagan: Green fields' Maroon stories). Shalidhan. ISBN 978-81-954667-0-2.
- Dineo, Paul; Mills, James (2001). Soccer in South Asia: Empire, Nation, Diaspora. London, United Kingdom: Frank Cass Publishers. p. 33. ISBN 978-0-7146-8170-2. Archived from the original on 25 July 2022.
- Martinez, Dolores; Mukharji, Projit B (2009). Football: From England to the World: The Many Lives of Indian Football. Routledge. ISBN 978-1-138-88353-6. Archived from the original on 2 July 2022.
- Nath, Nirmal (2011). History of Indian Football: Upto 2009–10. Readers Service. ISBN 9788187891963. Archived from the original on 22 July 2022.
- Tariq, T Islam (2025). মোহামেডান-আবাহনী ময়দানি লড়াই (transl. Mohammedan-Abahani battle field) (in Bengali). Annesha Prokashon. ISBN 978-984-99475-1-6.
