= List of Mohun Bagan Super Giant players =

Mohun Bagan Super Giant (commonly referred to as Mohun Bagan) is an Indian association football club based in Kolkata, West Bengal. Founded in 1889, it is one of the oldest football clubs in Asia. The club competes in the Indian Super League, the top tier of Indian football league system.

== List of players ==
- Appearances and goals are for Indian Super League and Super Cup matches only.
- Players are listed according to the date of their first team debut for the club. Only players with at least one appearance are included.

Statistics correct as of 28 August 2020

Table headers

- Nationality – If a player played international football, the country/countries he played for are shown. Otherwise, the player's nationality is given as their country of birth.
- Career span – The year of the player's first appearance for Mohun Bagan to the year of his last appearance.
- Matches – The total number of games played, both as a starter and as a substitute.

=== Squad ===
As of 19 July 2024

==== Promoted from youth system ====
No.	Name	Position	Date of Birth (Age)
3	Raj Basfore	CB	15 March 2003 (age 22)
32	Dippendu Biswas	CB	24 April 2003 (age 22)
36	Amandeep Vrish Bhan	LB	3 August 2004 (age 21)
30	Taison Singh	RW	11 August 2004 (age 21)
63	Saurabh Bhanwala	CB	18 December 1999 (age 25)
71	Salahudheen Adnan K	RW	21 May 2001 (age 24)

First team players
No.	Name	Position	Nat	Date of Birth (Age)	Date signed	Contract end	App	Goals	Assists	Transfer notes
Goalkeepers
1	Vishal Kaith	GK	(India)	22 July 1996 (age 29)	8 July 2022	2029	67	0	0	Signed from Chennaiyin FC
12	Dheeraj Singh	GK	(India)	4 July 2000 (age 25)	24 July 2024	2025	0	0	0	Signed from FC Goa
24	Syed Zahid	GK	(India)	16 April 2003 (age 22)	1 September 2023	2027	6	0	0	Signed from Indian Arrows
31	Arsh Anwer Shaikh	GK	(India)	9 July 2002 (age 23)	1 June 2020	2025	12	0	0	Signed from ATK
Defenders
4	Nuno Reis	CB	(Portugal)	31 January 1991 (age 34)	15 September 2024	2026	0	0	0	Signed from Melbourne City FC
21	Alberto Rodríguez	CB	(Spain)	31 December 1992 (age 32)	5 July 2024	2026	0	0	0	Signed from Persib Bandung
5	Tom Aldred	CB	(Scotland)	11 September 1990 (age 34)	2 July 2024	2026	0	0	0	Signed from Brisbane Roar FC
2	Sumit Rathi	CB / LB	(India)	26 August 2001 (age 23)	15 August 2020	2025	25	0	0	Signed from ATK
3	Raj Basfore	CB / LB / RB	(India)	15 March 2003 (age 22)	2022	2025	5	0	0	Signed from United SC
15	Subhasish Bose (Captain)	CB / LB	(India)	15 August 1995 (age 29)	13 August 2020	2025	119	5	5	Signed from Mumbai City FC
63	Saurabh Bhanwala	CB	(India)	18 December 1999 (age 25)	1 December 2024	2025	5	0	0	Youth system
32	Dippendu Biswas	CB / RB	(India)	24 April 2003 (age 22)	1 January 2024	2027	5	0	0	Youth system
44	Asish Rai	RB / RM	(India)	27 January 1999 (age 26)	20 June 2022	2027	61	2	3	Signed from Hyderabad FC
36	Amandeep Vrish Bhan	CB / LB	(India)	3 August 2004 (age 21)	20 January 2024	2025	5	0	0	Signed from Indian Arrows
77	Ravi Bahadur Rana	RB / LB	(India)	15 October 2002 (age 22)	1 August 2021	2025	14	0	0	Signed from Jamshedpur FC
Midfielders
45	Lalengmawia Ralte	DM / CM	(India)	7 October 2000 (age 24)	25 June 2024	2029	0	0	0	Signed from Mumbai City FC
7	Anirudh Thapa	DM / CM	(India)	15 January 1998 (age 27)	23 June 2023	2028	34	2	0	Signed from Chennaiyin FC
9	Dimitri Petratos	AM / RW / SS / ST / LW	(Australia)	10 November 1992 (age 32)	18 July 2022	2026	61	27	18	Signed from Al Wehda FC
10	Greg Stewart	AM	(Scotland)	17 March 1990 (age 35)	19 July 2024	2025				Signed from Kilmarnock F.C.
16	Abhishek Suryavanshi	CM	(India)	12 March 2001 (age 24)	14 August 2021	2027	25	0	0	Youth system
71	Salahudheen Adnan K	DM	(India)	26 May 2001 (age 24)	12 June, 2024	2026	1	0	0	Youth system
18	Sahal Abdul Samad	AM / LW / RW / LM / RM	(India)	1 April 1997 (age 28)	14 July 2023	2028	26	3	5	Signed from Kerala Blasters FC
22	Deepak Tangri	CB / DM / CM	(India)	1 February 1999 (age 26)	29 June 2021	2026	60	2	2	Signed from Chennaiyin FC
33	Glan Martins	DM / CM	(India)	1 July 1994 (age 31)	23 January 2023	2026	38	0	0	Signed from FC Goa
Attackers
11	Manvir Singh	ST /RW/ RM	(India)	6 November 1995 (age 29)	25 August 2020	2027	114	24	21	Signed from FC Goa
13	Ningomba Engson Singh	LW / RW	(India)	2 January 2003 (age 22)	29 October 2020	2025	7	0	0	Signed from ATK
17	Liston Colaco	ST / LM / LW	(India)	12 November 1998 (age 26)	9 June 2021	2027	92	24	17	Signed from Hyderabad FC
19	Ashique Kuruniyan	LW / RW	(India)	14 June 1997 (age 28)	20 June 2022	2027	30	1	3	Signed from Bengaluru FC
27	Md. Fardin Ali Molla	ST	(India)	10 April 2002 (age 23)	9 November 2021	2025	16	1	2	Signed from Mohammedan SC
30	Taison Singh	RW/RM	(India)	11 August 2004 (age 21)	2022	2025	3	0	0	Signed from Indian Arrows
35	Jason Cummings	ST/SS	(Australia)	1 August 1995 (age 30)	1 July 2023	2026	37	19	4	Signed from Central Coast Mariners FC
72	Suhail Bhat	ST	(India)	8 April 2005 (age 20)	1 June 2023	2025	15	1	0	Signed from Indian Arrows
29	Jamie Maclaren	ST	(Australia)	29 July 1993 (age 32)	22 July 2024	2028	0	0	0	Signed from Melbourne City FC
