= Sudhir Kumar Chatterjee =

Indian footballer

Reverend Sudhir Kumar Chatterjee
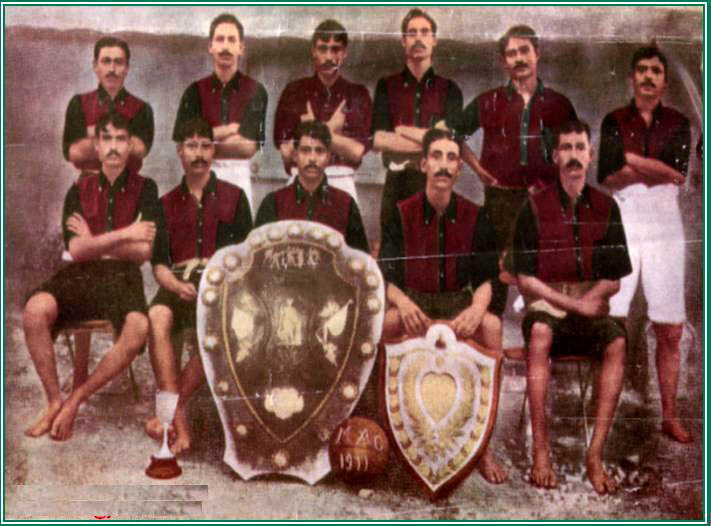
- The IFA Shield winning team of 1911 - Chatterjee standing fifth from left
- Born: 12 November 1883; Calcutta, Bengal Presidency, British India
- Died: 12 April 1966 (aged 82); Calcutta (now Kolkata), West Bengal, India

Rev Sudhir Kumar Chatterjee or Sudhir Kumar Chattopadhyay (1883–1966), was an Indian footballer of Mohun Bagan AC in the historic 1911 IFA Shield final, where they defeated the East Yorkshire Regiment to become the first Indian team to win the competition. He was also known as an famous educationist and a member of Christian clergy.

== Life ==
Born as Sudhir Kumar Chatterjee (or Sudhir Kumar Chattopadhyay) on 12 November 1883 and educated from Bishop's College in Theology. He joined Mohun Bagan AC in 1904, while he was engaged as a teacher in London Missionary Society College, Bhowanipore, Calcutta.

== Career ==
Chatterjee was the only booted member of the immortal eleven but his football career ended in 1914 due to serious injury. In the football team he was highly educated man. He had completed his M A degree. When his football career was over, he went for his higher studies from Cambridge University in England in 1923. He got the post of lecturer at Trinity College, Cambridge. But soon after he returned India, he established a Residential educational Institute named Bishnupur Shiksha Sangha at Bishnupur, South 24 Parganas. He was the Principal of the institute for several years. He was also associated with several educational institute, like Scottish Church College and Women' College at Calcutta.

Later in life, he became a priest and was known as The Reverend and represented India in several International Missionary Conferences.

== Love for football and country ==
His love for the game and Mohun Bagan remained undiminished. He witnessed the 1947 IFA Shield final, when Bagan won the tournament after a lapse of 36 years. He was the only surviving member of the 1911 team when the club celebrated its Platinum Jubilee in 1964. During the Sino-Indian War in 1962, he auctioned his 1911 gold medal and gave the proceeds to the national defense fund.

== Awards ==
Mohun Bagan AC awarded Chatterjee Mohun Bagan Ratna in 2010 posthumously.
