= List of East Bengal FC records and statistics =

East Bengal Football Club is an Indian professional football club based in Kolkata, West Bengal, which competes in Indian Super League, the top tier of Indian football. The club was formed when the vice-president of Jorabagan, Suresh Chandra Chaudhuri, resigned when Jorabagan sent out their starting eleven but with the notable exclusion of defender Sailesh Bose who was dropped from the squad for reasons not disclosed when they were about to face Mohun Bagan in the Cooch Behar Cup semi-final on 28 July 1920. He along with Raja Manmatha Nath Chaudhuri, Ramesh Chandra Sen and Aurobinda Ghosh, formed East Bengal, in Jorabagan home of Suresh Chandra on 1 August 1920; 99 years ago. East Bengal started playing in the Calcutta Football League 2nd division from 1921 and in 1925 they qualified for the first division for the first time and since then they have won numerous titles in Indian Football.

East Bengal joined the National Football League since its inception in 1996 and is the only club to play all seasons of top flight Indian football till date. East Bengal have won the top tier League four times: 2000–01, 2002–03, 2003–04, and 2025–26 and became runners-up 7 times, the most of any Indian clubs. Among other trophies, East Bengal have won the Calcutta Football League 41 times, IFA Shield 29 times, Federation Cup 8 times, Super Cup 1 time, and the Durand Cup 16 times.

== History ==
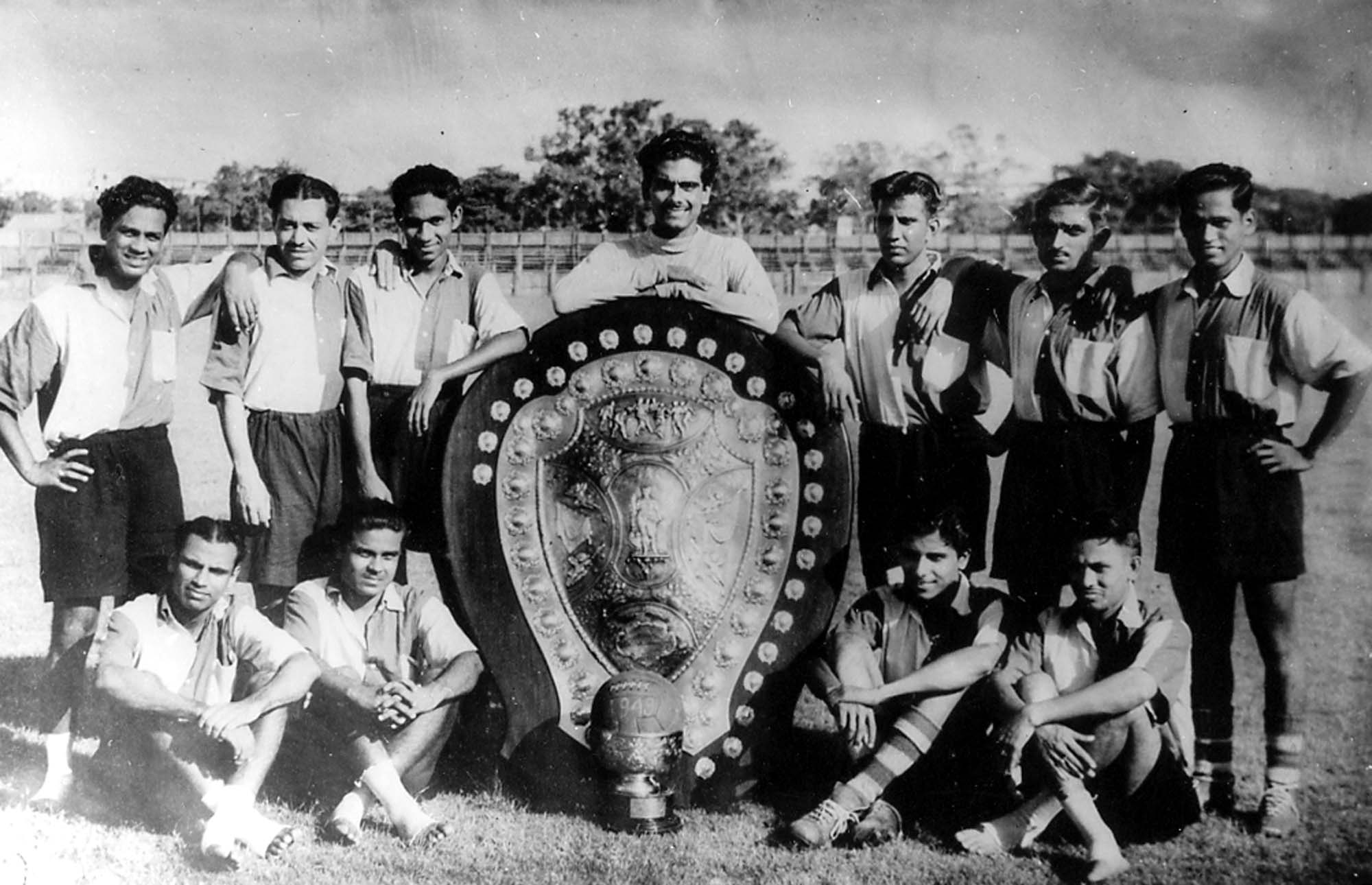
The East Bengal team with the 1949 IFA Shield trophy.

On 28 July 1920, Mohun Bagan was scheduled to play Jorabagan in the Cooch Behar Cup. Jorabagan sent out their starting eleven but with the notable exclusion of defender Sailesh Bose who was dropped from the squad for reasons not disclosed. The vice-president of Jorabagan, Suresh Chandra Chaudhuri, asked for Bose to be included in the line-up but the club coaches did not listen. Chaudhuri left the club due to this and, along with Raja Manmatha Nath Chaudhuri, Ramesh Chandra Sen and Aurobinda Ghosh, formed East Bengal on 1 August 1920, named after the region they hailed from. East Bengal Club played their first match in the 1920 Hercules Cup, which was a 7-a-side tournament that they won. After the tournament, the club became affiliated with the Indian Football Association. They won their first-ever full tournament in 1921, lifting the Khogendra Shield. The red and gold brigade qualified for the Calcutta Football League 1st division in 1925. They won their first 1st title in 1942. East Bengal won their first IFA Shield in 1943. In 1945, East Bengal won their first double of winning both Calcutta Football League and IFA Shield. From 1949 to 1951, East Bengal became the first team to make a hat-trick of wins in IFA Shield. In 1970, the club defeated Asian giants PAS Tehran to win the IFA Shield trophy. In 1972, East Bengal won Calcutta Football League, IFA Shield, Durand Cup and Rovers Cup in a single season, thus becoming the first team to do so. In 1972, East Bengal also made a record of being the first and till date only Indian team winning the Calcutta Football League without conceding a single goal, which they again repeated in 1991. In 1973, the club defeated Pyongyang City SC to lift the IFA Shield title and went on to defeat another North Korean team Dok Ro Gang to lift the DCM Trophy in the same season. In 1975, East Bengal broke the record by winning the Calcutta Football League consecutively for the 6th time (1970–75), bettering the record held by Mohammedan Sporting of winning it 5 times (1934–38). In 1975, East Bengal also created history as they defeated their arch-rivals Mohun Bagan by a record margin of 5–0, which is still being held today, in the IFA Shield final at the Mohun Bagan Ground. In 1976, East Bengal made a record of winning the IFA Shield 5 times in a row. In 1978, East Bengal participated in the Federation Cup for the first time and became joint champions with Mohun Bagan. In 1985, East Bengal won the Federation Cup and qualified for Asian Club Championships for the first time. East Bengal won the Coca-Cola Cup held in Colombo as a preliminary tournament for Central Asia Zone, and reached the group stages held in Jeddah, Saudi Arabia. In 1991 East Bengal qualified for the Asian Cup Winners' Cup for the first time and reached the quarter-finals. In 1993, East Bengal won their second tournament on foreign soil as they won the Wai Wai Cup in Nepal. In 2000–01, East Bengal won their maiden NFL title, winning it again in 2002-03 and 2003–04. In 2003, they won a major international trophy at Jakarta when they defeated BEC Tero Sasana to lift the 2003 ASEAN Club Championship. The club won their third trophy outside of India when they defeated South Korean Hannam University to lift the San Miguel Cup in Nepal. Between 2007 and 2012, East Bengal won the Federation Cup 4 times (2007, 2009, 2010, 2012). From 2010 to 2017, East Bengal again bettered their own record as they won the Calcutta Football League for 8 consecutive times.

In 2020, the club joined the Indian Super League and rebranded as SC East Bengal. They finished ninth in their debut season, having won three of the twenty league matches. The team finished eleventh, at the bottom in the 2021–22 season, winning just one game in the entire campaign. In 2022, the club rebranded itself as East Bengal FC and finished ninth again, having won six of the twenty league matches. In 2024, East Bengal won the Super Cup defeating Odisha in the final to break a twelve-year wait for a national cup trophy. In 2026, East Bengal won the Indian Super League, thus finally ending a twenty-two year long wait for a top tier national league title.

== Honours ==
East Bengal Club has won honours both domestically and in international competitions. They have won the National Football League title three times and the Federation Cup eight times. They also won the Calcutta Football League a record forty-one times and the IFA Shield a record twent-eight times. East Bengal Club has also won the Durand Cup sixteen times and the Rovers Cup ten times. Till date, the club has won more than one hundred fifty trophies including major and minor tournaments, which are listed below:

- Record
- ^{S} Shared record

East Bengal Club honours
Tournament	No.	Years	Ref.
AFC Central Asia Qualifier
Central Asia Champions' Cup	1	1985	
International (Major)
ASEAN Club Championship	1	2003	
International (Friendly)
(Nepal) Wai Wai Cup	1	1993	
(Nepal) San Miguel International Cup	1	2004	
Total	4		
Domestic (Major)
(India) National Football League/Indian Super League	4	2000–01, 2002–03, 2003–04, 2025–26	
(India) Federation Cup	8	1978, 1980, 1985, 1996, 2007, 2009–10, 2010, 2012	
(India) Super Cup	1	2024	
(India) Durand Cup	17^{S}	1951, 1952, 1956, 1960, 1967, 1970, 1972,1978, 1982, 1989, 1990, 1991, 1993, 1995, 2002, 2004, 2026	
(India) Indian Super Cup	3	1997, 2006, 2011	
(India) Calcutta Football League	41	1942, 1945, 1946, 1949, 1950, 1952, 1961, 1966, 1970, 1971, 1972, 1973, 1974, 1975, 1977, 1982, 1985, 1987, 1988, 1989, 1991, 1993, 1995, 1996, 1998, 1999, 2000, 2002, 2003, 2004, 2006, 2010, 2011, 2012, 2013, 2014, 2015, 2016, 2017, 2024, 2025	
(India) IFA Shield	29	1943, 1945, 1949, 1950, 1951, 1958, 1961, 1965, 1966, 1970, 1972, 1973, 1974, 1975, 1976, 1981, 1983, 1984, 1986, 1990, 1991, 1994, 1995, 1997, 2000, 2001, 2002–03, 2012, 2018	
(India) Rovers Cup	10	1949, 1962, 1967, 1969,1972. 1973, 1975, 1980, 1990, 1994	
Total	113		
Domestic (Minor and Other Trophies)
(India) DCM Trophy	7	1950, 1952, 1957, 1960, 1973, 1974, 1983	
(India) Bordoloi Trophy	5	1968, 1972, 1973, 1978, 1992	
(India) All Airlines Gold Cup	7	1987, 1988, 1990, 1992, 1995, 1998, 2001	
(India) Darjeeling Gold Cup	5	1976, 1981, 1982, 1985, 2018 (Note: East Bengal Reserves participated in the tournament.)	
(India) McDowell's Cup	3	1995, 1997, 2000	
(India) Sait Nagjee Football Tournament	2	1968, 1986	
(India) Stafford Cup	2	1981, 1986	
(India) Sanjay Gandhi Gold Cup	1	1984	
(India) Kalinga Cup	1	1993	
(India) SSS Trophy	2	1989, 1991	
(India) Independence Day Cup	1	2002	
(India) Dr. H. K. Mookherjee Shield	2	1957, 1961	
(India) ATPA Shield	1	1992	
(India) P. K. Nair Gold Cup	1	1956	
(India) Kerala FA Shield	1	1968	
(India) Mohammedan Sporting Platinum Jubilee Cup	1	2010	
(India) Hercules Cup	1	1920	
(India) Khogendra Cup	1	1921	
(India) Chandannager Cup	1	1920	
(India) Sachin Memorial Shield	1	1921	
(India) Cooch Behar Cup	5	1924, 1942, 1943, 1945, 1960	
(India) Trades Cup	4	1960, 1966, 1975, 1976	
(India) Gladstone Cup	1	1929	
(India) Griffith Shield	2	1929, 1946	
(India) Lady Hardinge Shield	2	1940, 1975	
(India) Lakshmibilas Cup	3	1920, 1968, 1969	
(India) Bardwan Cup	1	1938	
(India) S.C.I.S.T. Cup	1	1947	
(India) William Younger Cup	2	1969, 1976	
(India) Girija Shield	1	1942	
(India) Raja Memorial Shield	2	1960, 1975	
(India) Chandicharan Shield	1	1975	
(India) Madhyamgram MLA Cup	1	2023	
(India) Kulodakanta Memorial Shield	2	2023, 2025	
Total	74		
All Total	191^{m}		

- ^{m} Including minor trophies

== Player records ==
=== Goalscoring records ===
- Most goals in all competitions: Bhaichung Bhutia, 148.
- Most goals in Indian Super League: Cleiton Silva, 20.
- Most goals in National Football League / I-League: Bhaichung Bhutia, 49.
- Most goals in Calcutta Football League: Somana, 85.
- Most goals in Federation Cup: Bhaichung Bhutia, 14.
- Most goals in IFA Shield: K. P. Dhanraj, 27.
- Most goals in Durand Cup: Mohammed Habib and Surajit Sengupta, 17.
- Most goals in Rovers Cup: Tulsidas Balaram, 10.
- Most goals in D.C.M. Trophy: Moosa Ghazi, 12.
- Most goals in Continental competitions: Bhaichung Bhutia, 11.
- Most goals in a single Calcutta Football League campaign: Swami Nayar, 36 (During the 1946 season).
- Most goals in a sinymgle NFL / I-League campaign: Tolgay Ozbey and Chidi Edeh, 18 (During the 2011–12 and 2012–13 season respectively).
- Most goals in a single Indian Super League campaign: Cleiton Silva, 12 (During the 2022–23 season).
- Most goals in a single match: Fred Pugsley, 8 (against B.B & C.I. Railway, 23 September 1945, Rovers Cup).
- Most goals in a single match in NFL / I-League: Ranti Martins, 5 (against Dempo, 1 March 2015).
- Most goals in a single match in Continental competition: Biswajit Bhattacharya, 4 (against New Road Team, 2 August 1985, Coca-Cola Cup (Note: The Coca-Cola Cup - Central Asia Zone Preliminary Tournament for the 1985–86 Asian Club Championship was held in Colombo.)).
- Most goals in a single match against Foreign opponent: Bhaichung Bhutia, 6 (against Philippine Army FC, 16 July 2003, ASEAN Club Championship).
- Fastest goal: Cristiano Júnior, 15 seconds (against Tollygunge Agragami, 20 December 2003, 2003–04 NFL).
- Fastest goal in Indian Super League: P. V. Vishnu, 32 seconds (against Odisha, 29 February 2024, 2023–24 Indian Super League).
- Fastest goal in AFC competitions: Dimitrios Diamantakos, 33 seconds (against Bashundhara Kings, 29 October 2024, 2024–25 AFC Challenge League).
- Most hat-tricks in NFL / I-League: Ranti Martins, 3.
- Most hat-tricks in a single NFL / I-League campaign: Ranti Martins, 2 (During the 2015–16 season).
- Most hat-tricks in a single Calcutta Football League campaign: Swami Nayar, 4 (During the 1946 season).
- Fastest hat-trick: K. P. Dhanraj, 4 minutes 30 seconds, (against Maharana Club, 27 August 1949). (Note: 27 August 1949, East Bengal 8-0 Maharana Club, Semi Final 1949 IFA Shield, K. P. Dhanraj scored a hattrick inside the 5th minute (goals scored: 1', 2', 5') of the match.)
- Fastest hat-trick in NFL / I-League: Ranti Martins, 19 minutes, (against Aizawl, 12 March 2016). (Note: 12 March 2016, Aizawl F.C. 2-3 East Bengal FC, 2015–16, Ranti Martins scored a second-half hattrick within a span of 19 minutes (goals scored: 69' (pen.), 85', 88').)
- Most consecutive matches scored: Chima Okorie, 11 (During the 1987 Calcutta Football League season).
- Most consecutive matches scored in NFL / I-League: Cristiano Júnior, 7 (During the 2003–04 season). (Note: Cristiano Júnior scored in 7 consecutive matches from 16 December 2003 in round 4 against Churchill Brothers to 16 January 2004 in round 10 against Mohammedan Sporting.)
- Most consecutive matches scored in Indian Super League:

Cleiton Silva, 3 (During the 2022–23 season).
Saúl Crespo, 3 (During the 2023–24 season).

=== Hat-trick on debut ===
**Hat-trick on debut for East Bengal**
Date	Nationality	Name	Opponent	Tournament	Score	Ref
21 May 1963	India	Ashim Moulik	Sporting Union	Calcutta Football League	3–0	
19 June 1967	India	Shibram Sarkar	Sporting Union	Calcutta Football League	4–0	
6 November 2004	Nigeria	Ernest Jeremiah	Sporting Club de Goa	Durand Cup	4–0	
31 August 2010	India	Bikash Narzinary	Mohammedan AC	Calcutta Football League	5–0	
12 August 2017	India	Suhair Vadakkepeedika	NBP Rainbow AC	Calcutta Football League	4–1	

=== Top goalscorers ===
Competitive, professional matches only.

=== All time top scorers ===
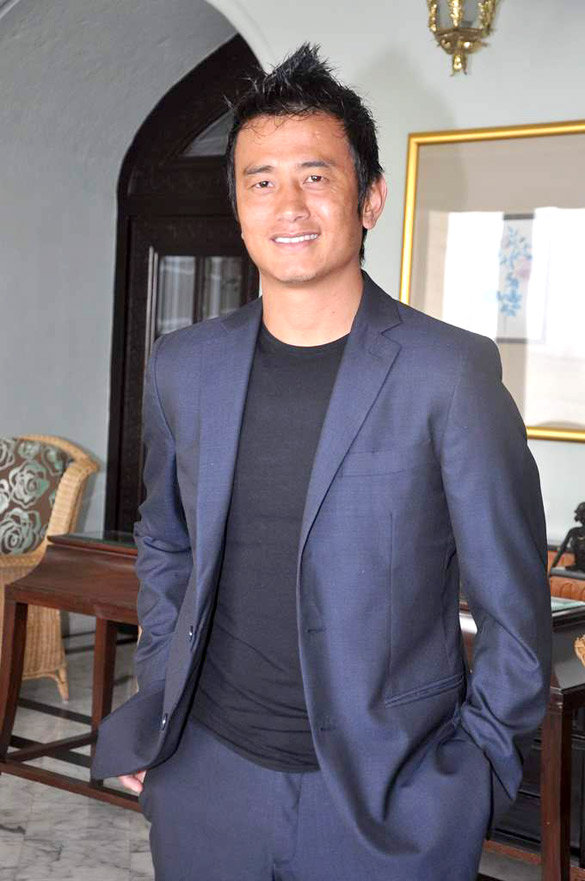
Bhaichung Bhutia, top scorer of East Bengal.

**All-time top scorers of East Bengal**
Ranking	Nationality	Name	Goals	Ref.
1	India	Bhaichung Bhutia	148	
2	India	K. P. Dhanraj	124	
3	Nigeria	Chima Okorie	122	
4	India	Mohammad Habib	112	
5	India	A.C. Somana	105	
5	India	Ashim Moulik	105	
7	India	Tulsidas Balaram	100	
8	India	Sunil Ghosh	94	
8	India	Surajit Sengupta	94	
10	India	Mohammed Akbar	90	
11	India	Parimal Dey	85	
12	India	P. Venkatesh	80	
12	India	Subhash Bhowmick	80	
14	India	Kuljit Singh	74	
15	Iran	Jamshid Nassiri	72	

=== Top scorers in Indian Super League ===
As of 7 November 2026

Players in Bold are part of the current squad.

**Top scorers of East Bengal in ISL**
Ranking	Nationality	Name	Goals	Ref.
1	Brazil	Cleiton Silva	20	
2	Spain	Youssef Ezzejjari	11	
3	India	**Naorem Mahesh Singh**	10	
4	India	Nandhakumar Sekar	8	
5	Spain	Saúl Crespo	7	
6	India	**P. V. Vishnu**	6	
7	India	**Edmund Lalrindika**	5	
7	India	**David Lalhlansanga**	5	
8	Germany	Matti Steinmann	4	
8	Croatia	Antonio Perosevic	4	
8	Greece	Dimitrios Diamantakos	4	
8	India	**Bipin Singh**	4	

=== Top scorers in National Football League/I-League ===
**Top Scorer for East Bengal in NFL/I-League**
Ranking	Nationality	Name	Goals	Ref.
1	India	Bhaichung Bhutia	49	
2	Australia	Tolgay Ozbey	35	
3	Nigeria	Ranti Martins	29	
4	Nigeria	Chidi Edeh	27	
5	Brazil	Edmilson Marques Pardal	23	
6	Nigeria	Mike Okoro	21	
7	India	Raman Vijayan	20	
7	Ghana	Yusif Yakubu	20	
9	India	Robin Singh	19	
10	Nigeria	Dudu Omagbemi	18	

=== Top scorers in Calcutta League ===
**Top Scorer for East Bengal in Calcutta League**
Ranking	Nationality	Name	Goals	Ref.
1	India	A.C. Somana	**85**	
2	India	Sunil Ghosh	**75**	
3	India	K. P. Dhanraj	**70**	
4	India	Surjo Chakraborty	**62**	
4	India	Mohammad Habib	**62**	

=== Appearance records ===
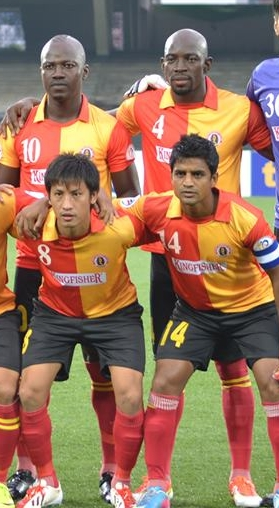
Mehtab Hossain (bottom right) in 2013 with East Bengal.

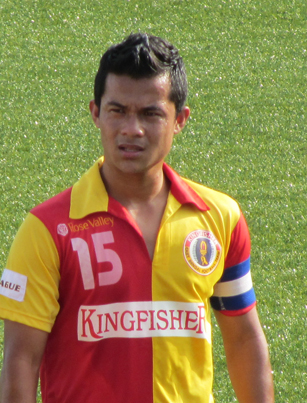
Sanju Pradhan in 2011 with East Bengal.

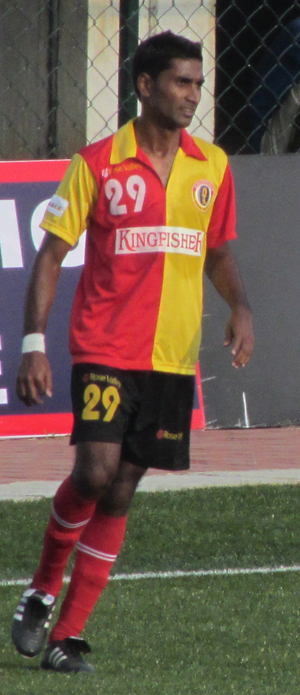
Saumik Dey in 2011 with East Bengal.

- Most appearances in Indian Super League: Naorem Mahesh Singh, 82.
- Most appearances in I-League: Mehtab Hossain, 175.
- Most appearances in AFC Cup: Mehtab Hossain, 34.
- Youngest player to play for East Bengal in Indian Super League: Vanlalpeka Guite, 16 years and 334 days (against Jamshedpur, 25 September 2023). (Note: Vanlalpeka Guite became the youngest ever player to debut in the Indian Super League for East Bengal when he came on in place of Naorem Mahesh Singh against Jamshedpur on 25 September 2023.)
- Youngest player to start for East Bengal in Indian Super League: Haobam Tomba Singh, 17 years and 306 days (against Kerala Blasters, 20 December 2020). (Note: Haobam Tomba Singh became the youngest ever player to start for a team in the Indian Super League when he debuted against Kerala Blasters FC on 20 December 2020.)

==== Most appearances in Indian Super League ====
The list of players with the most appearances in the Indian Super League for East Bengal. Indian midfielder Naorem Mahesh Singh holds the record with 82 total appearances with 70 from the starting line-up for the club.

Player names in bold are part of the current squad.
As of 18 October 2026

**List of players with most appearances in the Indian Super League for East Bengal**
SL no.	Position	Nationality	Name	Total Apps	Starts	Seasons Played
1	Midfielder	India	**Naorem Mahesh Singh**	82	70	2021–
2	Defender	India	**Lalchungnunga**	62	55	2022–
3	Forward	Brazil	Cleiton Silva	59	51	2022–25
4	Goalkeeper	India	**Prabhsukhan Singh Gill**	56	56	2023–
5	Midfielder	India	**Souvik Chakrabarti**	55	39	2022–
6	Midfielder	India	**P. V. Vishnu**	55	34	2023–
7	Defender	India	Mohammad Rakip	48	33	2022–26
8	Forward	India	Nandhakumar Sekar	45	31	2023–26
9	Midfielder	Spain	Saúl Crespo	34	33	2023–26
10	Defender	India	Nishu Kumar	33	25	2023–25

==== Most Appearances in I-League ====
The list of players with the most number of appearances in the I-League era for East Bengal, starting from 2007-08 I-League till 2019-20 I-League before the Red and Gold brigade moved into Indian Super League. Indian former International and former East Bengal captain Mehtab Hossain holds the record for the most appearances for the East Bengal having made 175 total appearances with 165 starts.

Player names in bold are still part of the current squad.
As of till the end of 2019–20 I-League season.

**List of players with most appearances in the I-League (2007–2020) for East Bengal**
SL no.	Position	Nationality	Name	Total Apps	Starts	Seasons Played
1	Midfielder	India	Mehtab Hossain	175	165	2007–17
2	Left Back	India	Saumik Dey	115	111	2007–16
3	Midfielder	India	Harmanjot Khabra	113	96	2009–16
4	Midfielder	India	Sanju Pradhan	104	65	2008–13; 2015–16
5	Centre-back	Nigeria	Uga Okpara	95	94	2009–14
6	Midfielder	India	Lalrindika Ralte	92	75	2012–17; 2018–20
7	Centre-back	India	Arnab Mondal	86	81	2012–18
8	Centre-back	India	Gurwinder Singh	83	71	2010–18; 2019–20
9	Midfielder	India	Syed Rahim Nabi	75	73	2007–11
10	Midfielder	Nigeria	Penn Orji	72	69	2010–13

=== Most uninterrupted seasons played ===
**List of East Bengal players with most uninterrupted number of seasons played**
SL no.	Name	Position	Years of Playing	Playing Years	Captained
1	Moni Talukdar	Goal Keeper	1920–1937	18	1932,1933
2	Dulal Guha Thakurta	Forward	1927-1942	16	1935,1936
3	Rakhal Majumdar	Defender	1937-1952	16	1943
4	Mandipalli Apparao	Forward	1941-1955	15	1946
5	Tushar Rakshit	Midfielder	1991-2005	15	1995
6	Noni Gossain	Center Half	1921-1934	14	1926
7	Monoranjan Bhattacharya	Defender	1977-1990	14	1981
8	Alvito D'Cunha	Midfielder	2002-2015	14	2006
9	Bhanu Dutta Ray	Defender	1922-1934	13	1923
10	Promod Dasgupta	Defender	1936-1948	13	1938,1939,1940
11	Tarun Dey	Defender	1982-1994	13	1986
12	Saumik Dey	Defender	2005-2016	12	2010
13	Ram Bahadur	Midfielder	1957-1967	11	1960
14	Mehtab Hossain	Midfielder	2007-2017	11	2013-14
15	Sunil Ghosh	Forward	1940-1949	10	1944
16	Byomkesh Bose	Defender	1949-1958	10	1951
17	Dipankar Roy	Midfielder	1999-2009	10	2005

=== East Bengal players at the Olympics ===
East Bengal club holds the record among Indian clubs to produce most players to have represented the national team in the Olympic Games.

**List of East Bengal players to represent the national team at the Olympics**
Year	City	Nationality	Name	Position
1948	London	India	Syed M. Kaiser	MF
1952	Helsinki	India	S. Roy	DF
1952	Helsinki	India	Chandan Singh Rawat	DF
1952	Helsinki	India	Byomkesh Bose	MF
1952	Helsinki	India	Pansanttom Venkatesh	FW
1952	Helsinki	India	Ahmed Khan	FW
1952	Helsinki	India	P. B. A. Saleh	FW
1956	Melbourne	India	Mariappa Kempaiah	MF
1956	Melbourne	India	Kittu	FW
1960	Rome	India	Arun Ghosh	DF
1960	Rome	India	Ram Bahadur Chettri	MF
1960	Rome	India	Dharmalingam Kannan	FW
1960	Rome	India	Tulsidas Balaram	FW

== Transfer records ==
The fees in the record transfer tables below are all sourced from news portals that cover Indian football.

=== Record transfer fees paid ===
Record transfer fees paid by East Bengal FC
Rank	Player	From	Fee	Date	Ref.
1	(India) Jeakson Singh	Kerala Blasters	₹3.2 crore (US$340,000)	19 July 2024	
2	(India) Anwar Ali	Delhi	₹2.5 crore (US$270,000)	13 August 2024	
3	(India) Jay Gupta	Goa	₹1.6 crore (US$170,000)	15 July 2025	
4	(India) Prabhsukhan Singh Gill	Kerala Blasters	₹1.5 crore (US$160,000)	12 July 2023	
5	(India) Edmund Lalrindika	Inter Kashi	₹1.45 crore (US$150,000)	14 May 2025	

== Coaching records ==
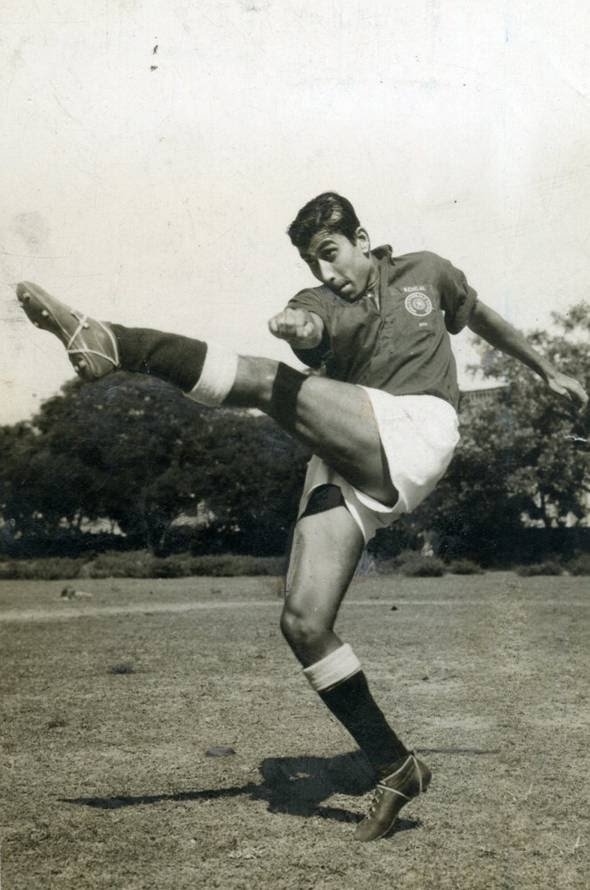
P. K. Banerjee during his playing days for the Indian national football team.

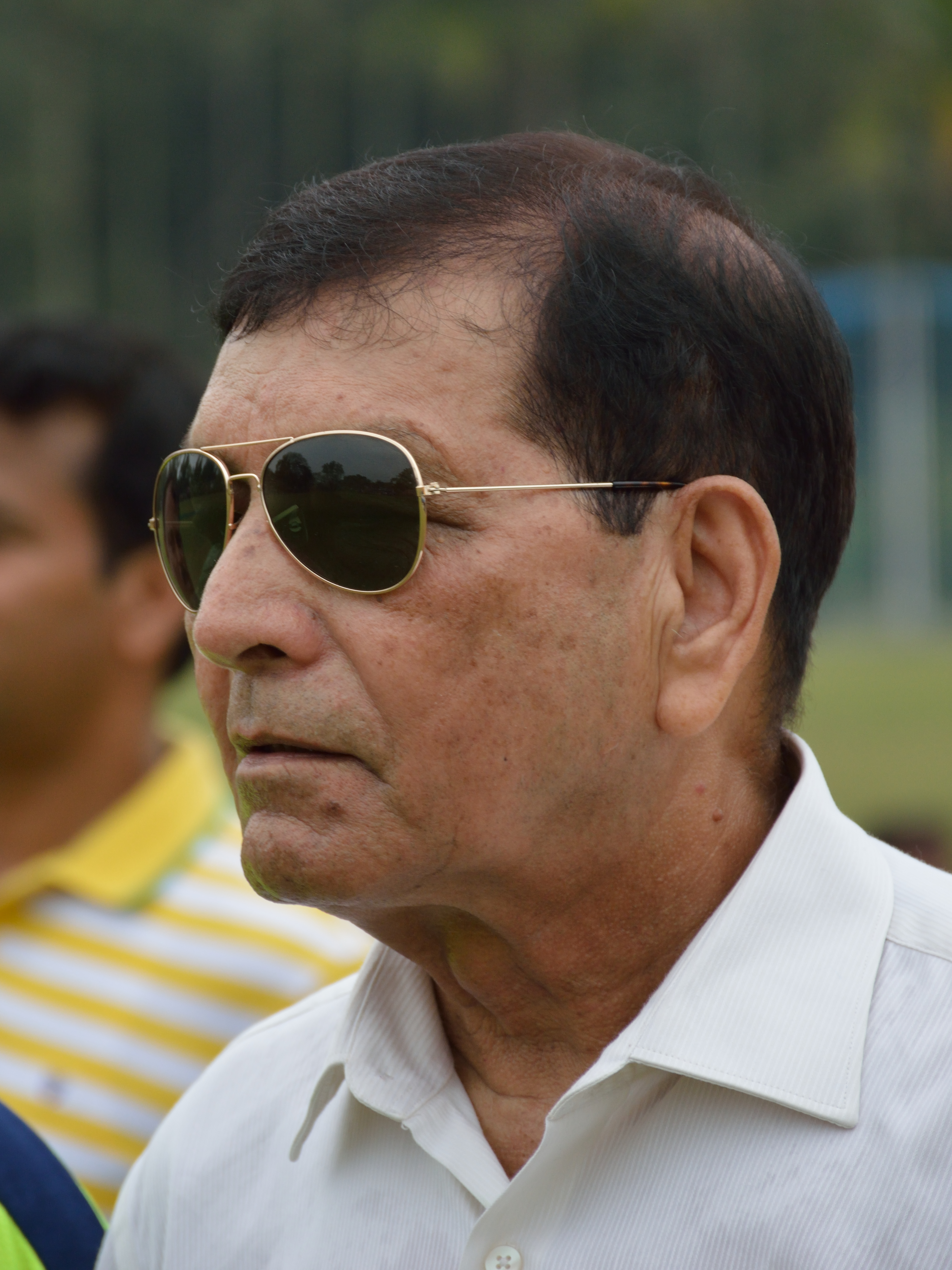
Syed Nayeemuddin, the triple crown winning coach in 2016.

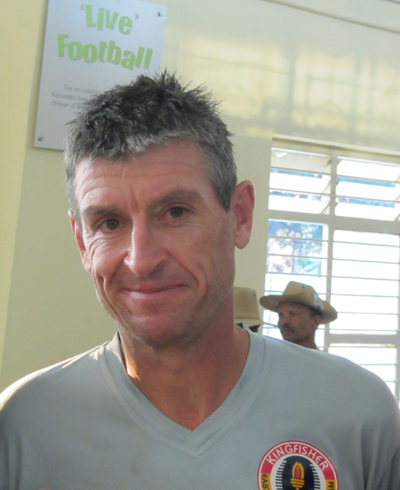
Trevor James Morgan as the East Bengal coach in 2010.

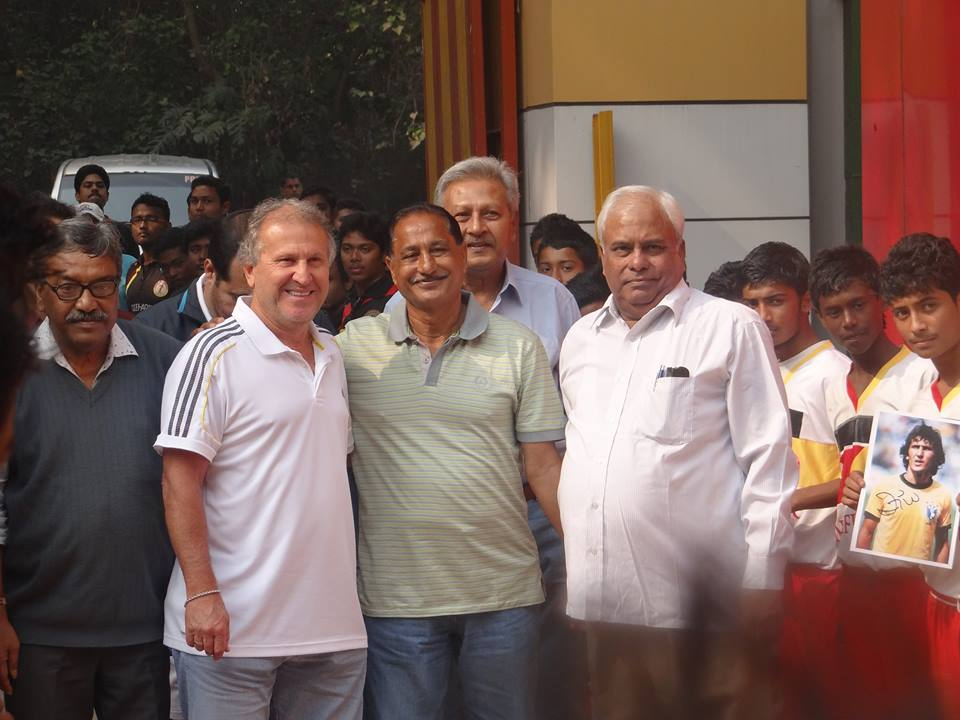
East Bengal coach Armando Colaco with Brazilian legend Zico at the club tent in 2014.

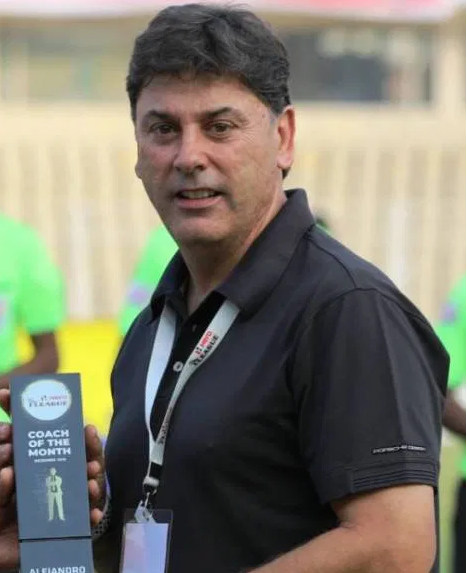
Alejandro Menéndez with I-League coach of the month award (December 2019) in January 2020.

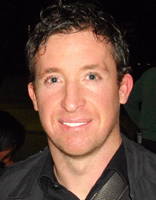
Robbie Fowler, Head-coach of East Bengal in the 2020–21 season.

=== Firsts ===
- First coach to be appointed professionally: Sushil Bhattacharya, 1961.
- First coach of foreign nationality: Philippe De Ridder, 2005.
- First coach to win the National Football League: Monoranjan Bhattacharya, 2000-01.
- First coach to win the Federation Cup: Arun Ghosh, 1978.
- First coach to win the Indian Super Cup: Monoranjan Bhattacharya, 1997.
- First coach to win the Super Cup: Carles Cuadrat, 2024.
- First coach to win the Indian Super League: Oscar Bruzon, 2025–26.

=== Records ===
- Longest serving coach: P. K. Banerjee, 396 matches. (Note: P. K. Banerjee served as the head coach of East Bengal for 9 seasons: 1972–76, 1980–81, 1983–84, 1985–86, 1988–90. He was also appointed as the Technical Director of the team in 1996–97.)
- Most matches won as head coach: P. K. Bannerjee, 292 matches.
- Most trophies won as head coach: P. K. Bannerjee, 31.
- Most trophies won in a single stint as head coach: P. K. Bannerjee, 16 (During 1972–76).
- Most NFL/I-League won as head coach: Subhash Bhowmick, 2.
- Most Federation cups won as head coach: P. K. Banerjee and Trevor James Morgan, 2.
- Most Calcutta League won as head coach: P. K. Banerjee, 7. (Note: P. K. Banerjee won 7 Calcutta Football League titles as the head coach of East Bengal club: 1972, 1973, 1974, 1975, 1985, 1988, 1989.)
- Most international trophies won as head coach: Subhash Bhowmick, 2. (Note: Subhash Bhowmick led East Bengal to two titles on foreign soil: 2003 ASEAN Club Championship, Jakarta and 2004 San Miguel International Cup, Kathmandu.)
- Coaches who won the Triple Crown: P. K. Banerjee and Syed Nayeemuddin (in 1972–73 and 1990–91 respectively).

=== Managers at East Bengal since the start of National Football League ===
Record in competitive matches for East Bengal coaches since the beginning of National Football League in India from the 1996–1997 season.

Note: Penalty shoot-out wins or losses are counted as draws, as per the official standard.

As of 7 November 2026

Record in Competitive matches for East Bengal coaches
Name	Nat.	From	To	P	W	D	L	GF	GA	GD	Win%
Monoranjan Bhattacharya	India	1 April 1996	31 March 1999	176	111	36	29	289	117	+172	63.07
Subhash Bhowmick	India	20 May 1999	31 March 2000	51	28	12	11	71	31	+40	54.90
Syed Nayeemuddin	India	4 April 2000	13 January 2001	32	25	2	5	56	16	+40	78.13
Monoranjan Bhattacharya	India	13 January 2001	24 January 2002	52	31	13	8	84	29	+55	59.62
Subhash Bhowmick	India	25 January 2002	2 December 2005	200	133	29	38	384	144	+240	66.50
Bikash Panji (Note: Caretaker manager after Subhash Bhowmick was sacked for legal reasons.)	India	4 December 2005	15 December 2005	2	1	0	1	3	2	+1	50.00
Philippe De Ridder	Belgium	15 December 2005	31 May 2006	18	10	4	4	27	17	+10	55.56
Carlos Roberto Pereira	Brazil	4 July 2006	22 May 2007	38	18	9	11	53	43	+10	47.37
Subrata Bhattacharya	India	23 May 2007	16 January 2008	30	15	4	11	52	40	+12	50.00
Monoranjan Bhattacharya	India	16 January 2008	19 February 2008	7	3	2	2	6	5	+1	42.86
Aloke Mukherjee	India	20 February 2008	31 May 2008	9	2	2	5	6	10	−4	22.22
Monoranjan Bhattacharya	India	1 July 2008	15 September 2008	14	7	4	3	21	12	+9	50.00
Stanley Rozario	India	16 September 2008	24 December 2008	15	6	4	5	16	12	+4	40.00
Subhash Bhowmick	India	24 December 2008	25 October 2009	20	5	6	9	32	33	−1	25.00
Tushar Rakshit (Note: Caretaker manager after Subhash Bhowmick resigned. Includes record for the matches against Salgaocar on 29.10.2009, Chirag Kerala on 2.11.2009, Air India on 7.11.2009 and Shillong Lajong on 12.11.2009, as Tushar was in-charge as the head-coach before Philippe De Ridder took over.)	India	25 October 2009	12 November 2009	4	3	1	0	6	1	+5	75.00
Philippe De Ridder	Belgium	6 November 2009	31 May 2010	46	16	17	13	56	52	+4	34.78
Trevor James Morgan	England	16 July 2010	24 May 2013	178	112	31	35	351	160	+191	62.92
Marcos Falopa	Brazil	12 June 2013	14 November 2013	11	5	2	4	20	17	+3	45.45
Armando Colaco	India	14 November 2013	19 February 2015	54	30	15	9	99	47	+52	55.56
Eelco Schattorie	Netherlands	20 February 2015	31 May 2015	20	8	4	8	31	31	+0	40.00
Biswajit Bhattacharya	India	19 June 2015	11 April 2016	29	19	5	5	60	31	+29	65.52
Trevor James Morgan	England	13 April 2016	17 April 2017	28	18	4	6	48	24	+24	64.29
Ranjan Chowdhury Sr. (Note: Academy Head Coach Ranjan Chowdhury was announced as the head-coach cum manager for the Bordoloi Trophy as Trevor Morgan left for holidays after the CFL.)	India	19 September 2016	30 September 2016	5	4	0	1	13	2	+11	80.00
Mridul Banerjee	India	18 April 2017	19 April 2017	0	0	0	0	0	0	+0	—
Ranjan Chowdhury (Note: Caretaker manager under Technical-Director Monoranjan Bhattacharya.)	India	20 April 2017	31 May 2017	6	3	2	1	10	4	+6	50.00
Khalid Jamil	India	21 July 2017	26 April 2018	31	18	9	4	65	31	+34	58.06
Bastob Roy (Note: Head-coach under Technical-Director Subhash Bhowmick.)	India	18 May 2018	19 August 2018	11	7	2	2	19	7	+12	63.64
Alejandro Menéndez (Note: Include two walkovers East Bengal awarded: 1. vs Delhi Dynamos in 2019 Indian Super Cup; 2. vs Calcutta Customs in 2019 CFL Premier Division.)	Spain	19 August 2018	21 January 2020	43	24	7	12	75	38	+37	55.81
Bastob Roy (Note: Interim head-coach after Alejandro Menéndez left and before Mario Rivera Campesino took charge. Includes record for the match against Chennai City on 25.01.2020.)	India	21 January 2020	26 January 2020	1	1	0	0	2	0	+2	100.00
Mario Rivera Campesino	Spain	23 January 2020	31 May 2020	8	3	3	2	11	8	+3	37.50
Francisco Bruto Da Costa (Note: Francisco Bruto Da Costa was appointed as the head coach however, his contract was mutually terminated before the Indian Super League campaign started.)	India	30 July 2020	9 October 2020	0	0	0	0	0	0	+0	—
Robbie Fowler	England	9 October 2020	8 September 2021	20	3	8	9	22	33	−11	15.00
Manolo Díaz	Spain	8 September 2021	28 December 2021	8	0	4	4	10	18	−8	0.00
Renedy Singh (Note: Interim head coach after Manolo Díaz left charge. Includes record for the matches against Bengaluru on 4.01.2022, Mumbai City on 7.01.2022 and Jamshedpur on 11.01.2022, as Renedy was in-charge as the head-coach before Mario Rivera Campesino took over.)	India	28 December 2021	14 January 2022	3	0	2	1	1	2	−1	0.00
Mario Rivera Campesino	Spain	1 January 2022	31 May 2022	9	1	2	6	7	16	−9	11.11
Bino George (Note: East Bengal Club Reserves head-coach Bino George took charge of the team for the Calcutta Football League for four seasons: 2022, 2023, 2024, 2025 and the first match of the 2026 as East Bengal mostly field their reserve squad, with the first team playing in the Indian Super League.) (Note: Include five walkovers East Bengal received. Two in the 2023 CFL Premier Division: 1. vs Bhawanipore; 2. vs Mohun Bagan SG; Two in the 2024 CFL Premier Division: 3. vs Bhawanipore; 4. vs Diamond Harbour; One in the 2025 CFL Premier Division: 5. vs Army Red.) (Note: Interim head coach after Carles Cuadrat left charge. Includes record for the match against Jamshedpur on 5.10.2024, as Bino was in-charge as the head-coach before Óscar Bruzón took over.) (Note: Includes record for the 2025 Sikkim Gold Cup where East Bengal mostly fielded their reserve squad and Bino George took charge of the team.) (Note: Includes record for the 2026 IFA Shield group stage fixture against Calcutta Customs where East Bengal mostly fielded their reserve squad and Bino George took charge of the team.)	India	26 July 2022	present	57	41	10	6	151	36	+115	71.93
Stephen Constantine	England	27 July 2022	25 April 2023	27	7	6	14	32	48	−16	25.93
Carles Cuadrat	Spain	25 April 2023	30 September 2024	40	16	8	16	60	54	+6	40.00
Óscar Bruzón	Spain	8 October 2024	31 May 2026	52	25	14	13	95	53	+42	48.08
Archisman Biswas (Note: East Bengal Club Reserves head-coach Bino George remained busy with the senior squad, hence assistant coach Archisman Biswas took charge for the 2026 CFL Premier Division as the head coach for all the matches except for the first match, as East Bengal mostly field their reserve squad, with the first team playing in the Indian Super League.) (Note: Archisman Biswas coached East Bengal as they fielded the reserves team for the 2026 Sikkim Gold Cup.)	India	25 October 2025	present	15	8	5	2	34	12	+22	53.33
Antonio Lopez Habas	Spain	6 July 2026	present	17	8	3	6	45	20	+25	47.06

=== Foreign managers at East Bengal ===
Record in competitive matches for foreign coaches.

Note: Penalty shoot-out wins or losses are counted as draws, as per the official standard.

As of 7 November 2026

Record for foreign coaches at East Bengal
Name	Nat.	From	To	P	W	D	L	GF	GA	GD	Win %
Philippe De Ridder (Note: Philippe De Ridder was appointed on 6 November 2009, however, he took charge of the team from 18 November, from the match against Railway FC in the 2009–10 season.)	Belgium	15 December 2005	31 May 2006	18	10	4	4	27	17	+10	55.56
Philippe De Ridder	Belgium	6 November 2009	31 May 2010	46	16	17	13	60	52	+8	34.78
Philippe De Ridder	Belgium	Total		64	26	21	17	87	69	+18	40.63
Carlos Roberto Pereira	Brazil	4 July 2006	31 May 2007	38	18	9	11	53	43	+10	47.37
Trevor James Morgan	England	16 July 2010	24 May 2013	178	112	31	35	351	160	+191	62.92
Trevor James Morgan	England	13 April 2016	17 April 2017	28	18	4	6	48	24	+24	64.29
Trevor James Morgan	England	Total		206	130	35	41	399	184	+215	63.11
Marcos Falopa	Brazil	12 June 2013	14 November 2013	11	5	2	4	20	17	+3	45.45
Eelco Schattorie	Netherlands	20 February 2015	31 May 2015	20	8	4	8	31	31	+0	40.00
Alejandro Menéndez (Note: Includes two walkovers East Bengal awarded; 1. vs Delhi Dynamos in 2019 Indian Super Cup; 2. vs Calcutta Customs in 2019 Calcutta Premier Division.)	Spain	19 August 2018	21 January 2020	43	24	7	12	75	38	+37	55.81
Mario Rivera Campesino (Note: Mario Rivera was appointed on 23 January 2020, however, he took charge of the team from 26 January, from the match against Indian Arrows in the 2019–20 season.)	Spain	23 January 2020	31 May 2020	8	3	3	2	11	8	+3	37.50
Mario Rivera Campesino	Spain	1 January 2022	31 May 2022	9	1	2	6	7	16	−9	11.11
Mario Rivera Campesino	Spain	Total		17	4	5	8	18	24	−6	23.53
Robbie Fowler	England	9 October 2020	8 September 2021	20	3	8	9	22	33	−11	15.00
Manolo Díaz	Spain	8 September 2021	28 December 2021	8	0	4	4	10	18	−8	0.00
Stephen Constantine	England	27 July 2022	25 April 2023	27	7	6	14	32	48	−16	25.93
Carles Cuadrat	Spain	25 April 2023	30 September 2024	40	16	8	16	60	54	+6	40.00
Óscar Bruzón	Spain	8 October 2024	31 May 2026	52	25	14	13	95	53	+42	48.08
Antonio Lopez Habas	Spain	6 July 2026	present	17	8	3	6	45	20	+25	47.06

=== Most successful managers at East Bengal ===
Below is the list of the 5 most successful East Bengal head-coaches as per most honours won:

No	Name	I-League/NFL	Fed Cup	Calcutta League	IFA Shield	Durand Cup	Rovers Cup	Others	Total
1	(India) Pradip Kumar Banerjee	—	2	7	5	2	4	9 (Note: Coca-Cola Cup, DCM Trophy (3), All Airlines Gold Cup, Bordoloi Trophy (2), SSS Trophy, Darjeeling Gold Cup.)	29
2	(India) Syed Nayeemuddin	0	0	3	5	3	2	3 (Note: McDowell's Cup (2), All Airlines Gold Cup.)	16
3	(India) Subhash Bhowmick	2	0	4	1	2	0	3 (Note: Independence Cup, ASEAN Club Championship, San Miguel International Cup.)	12
3	(India) Amal Dutta	—	0	2	2	1	0	7 (Note: Darjeeling Gold Cup (2), Sanjay Gandhi Gold Cup, All Airlines Gold Cup, SSS Trophy, ATPA Shield, Bordoloi Trophy.)	12
5	(India) Monoranjan Bhattacharya	1	1	2	2	0	0	4 (Note: Indian Super Cup, McDowell's Cup, All Airlines Gold Cup (2).)	10

=== Most trophies won in a single stint ===
No	Seasons	Name	I-League/NFL	Federation Cup	Calcutta League	IFA Shield	Durand Cup	Rovers Cup	Others (Note: Includes ASEAN Club Championship, D.C.M. Trophy, All Airlines Gold Cup, Bordoloi Trophy, Wai Wai Cup, Super Cup, San Miguel International Cup, McDowell's Cup, Independence Cup, Platinum Jubilee Cup, SSS Trophy.)	Total
1	1972–73 to 1975–76	(India) Pradip Kumar Banerjee	–	–	4	4	1	3	4	16
2	2001–02 to 2005–06	(India) Subhash Bhowmick	2	0	3	1	2	0	3	11
3	2010–11 to 2012–13	(England) Trevor James Morgan	0	2	3	1	0	—	2	8
4	1994–95 to 1995–96	(India) Syed Nayeemuddin	—	0	1	2	1	1	2	7
4	1996–97 to 1998–99	(India) Monoranjan Bhattacharya	0	1	2	1	0	0	3	7
5	1990–91 to 1991–92	(India) Syed Nayeemuddin	—	0	1	2	2	1	0	6

== Club records ==
=== Matches ===
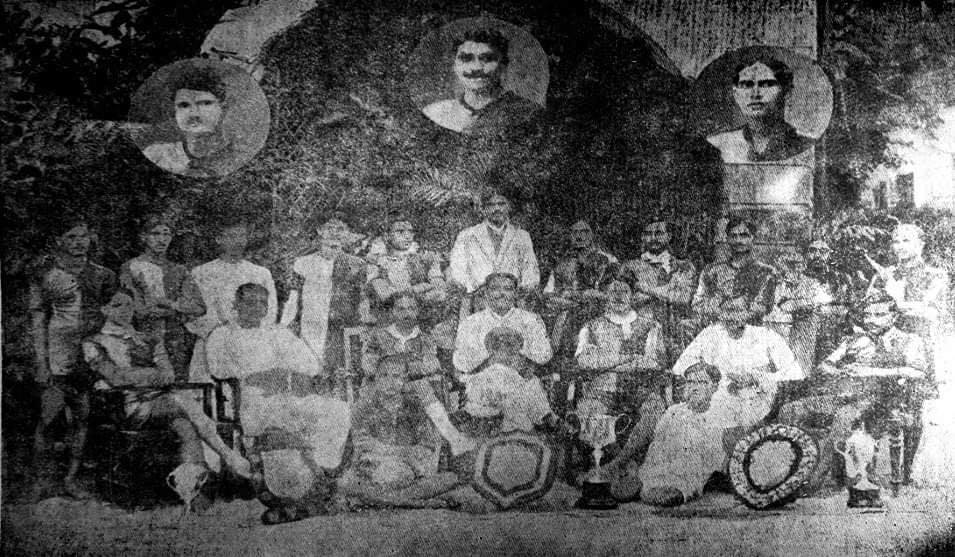
East Bengal players and officials in 1921.

==== Firsts ====
- First match: East Bengal 4–0 Metropolitan College, 12 August 1920. (Note: East Bengal formed on 1 August 1920, participated in the 6-a-side Hercules Cup tournament held at the Kumartuli Ground as they debuted into football.)
- First Calcutta League 2nd Div match: East Bengal 0–0 Sobhabazar Club, 1 May 1921.
- First Calcutta League 1st Div match: East Bengal 1–4 Calcutta FC, 9 May 1925.
- First win in Calcutta League 1st Div: East Bengal 2–1 Dalhousie, 25 May 1925.
- First IFA Shield match: East Bengal 1–1 Town Club, 20 July 1921.
- First Durand Cup match: East Bengal 2–0 Army Headquarters FC, 1926.
- First Rovers Cup match: East Bengal 6–0 Royal Navy, 6 September 1941.
- First Federation Cup match: East Bengal 5–0 Rajasthan Police, 22 April 1978.
- First NFL / I-League match: Mohammedan Sporting 1–2 East Bengal, 17 December 1996.
- First Indian Super League match: East Bengal 0–2 Mohun Bagan, 27 November 2020.
- First win in Indian Super League match: East Bengal 3–1 Odisha, 3 January 2021.
- First competitive Continental match: East Bengal 7–0 New Road Team, 1 August 1985.

==== Wins ====
Highest margin of victories in different tournaments
Tournament	Date	Opponent	Score	Goal scorers	Ref
Rovers Cup	23 September 1945	B.B & C.I. Railway	11–0	Sunil Ghosh (2), Fred Pugsley (8), Sushil Chatterjee	
Calcutta Football League	10 June 1943	Dalhousie	10–0	A. C. Somana (4), Arokiraj (4), Appa Rao (2)	
Calcutta Football League	28 June 1949	Calcutta Garrison	10–0	P.B.A. Saleh (3), Abid (4), K. P. Dhanraj (2), P. Venkatesh	
Calcutta Football League	26 September 2023	Kidderpore	10–1	P. V. Vishnu (4), Mahitosh Roy (3), Jesin TK, V. P. Suhair (2)	
Durand Cup	26 December 1972	B.B.Star	10–0	Md. Akbar (4), Md. Habib (2), Mohan Singh, Latifuddin, Shambu Moitra, Samaresh Chowdhury	
IFA Shield	14 July 1936	Victoria Sporting	9–0	N. Majumdar (3), P. Mukherjee (2), S. M. Kaiser, Dulal Guha Thakurta, A. Hussain, Hira Das	
IFA Shield	22 September 2003	Wari	9–0	Dipankar Roy (4), Bijen Singh (2), Kalia Kulothungan, Douglas De Silva, Shylo Malsawmtluanga	
Asian Club Championship	10 August 1985	Club Valencia	9–0	Debashis Roy (3), Jamshid Nassiri (2), Monojit Das (2), Debashis Misra, Samir Chaudhury	
Asian Cup Winners' Cup	15 August 1997	Tribhuvan Club	8–0	Bhaichung Bhutia (2), Somatai Shaiza, Naushad Moosa, Preto Garcia, Nazimul Haq, Falguni Dutta, A. Sarvanan	
DCM Trophy	16 October 1960	D.F.A. Jalandhar	8–0	Kanayan (3), D. Kannan (3), Narayan, Tulsidas Balaram	
I-League	23 November 2011	HAL	8–1	Tolgay Ozbey (4), Uga Okpara (2), Robin Singh, Baljit Sahni	
Indian Super League	23 March 2026	Mohammedan	7–0	Anwar Ali (2), Youssef Ezzejjari (2), Saúl Crespo, P. V. Vishnu, Nandhakumar Sekar	
Federation Cup	22 April 1978	Rajasthan Police	5–0	Surajit Sengupta, Ranjit Mukherjee, Mihir Bose, Ulganathan, Prasanta Banerjee	
Federation Cup	28 August 1998	Vasco	5–0	Raman Vijayan (2), Renedy Singh (2), Carlton Chapman	
Federation Cup	31 July 2003	HAL	5–0	Bijen Singh (2), Chandan Das (2), Dipankar Roy	
AFC Cup	15 May 2013	Yangon United	5–1	Chidi Edeh (3), Penn Orji, Mehtab Hossain	

==== Defeats ====
- Worst defeat: Dynamo Kyiv 13–1 East Bengal, 6 September 1953. (Note: Friendly Match, at the Dynamo Stadium in Kyiv in East Bengal Club's tour to USSR in 1953.)
- Worst defeat in Calcutta League: Dalhousie 7–1 East Bengal, 1928
- Worst defeat in Indian Super League:

East Bengal 0–4 Hyderabad, 24 January 2022 (During the 2021–22 season).
NorthEast United 4–0 East Bengal, 8 March 2025 (During the 2024–25 season).

- Worst defeat in NFL/I-League:

Shillong Lajong 5–1 East Bengal, 30 May 2015 (During the 2014–15 season).
Salgaocar 4–0 East Bengal, 29 December 2011 (During the 2011–12 season).

- Worst defeat in Continental competitions: Dalian Wanda 6–0 East Bengal, 19 September 1998 (During the 1998–99 Asian Club Championship).

==== Consecutive titles ====
- Most consecutive NFL/I-League titles: 2 (2002–03, 2003–04) shared record.
- Most consecutive Calcutta Football League titles: 8 (2010 to 2017) record.
- Most consecutive IFA Shield titles: 5 (1972 to 1976).
- Most consecutive Federation Cup titles: 2 (2009–10, 2010).
- Most consecutive Durand Cup titles: 3 (1989 to 1991) shared record.
- Most consecutive Rovers Cup titles: 2 (1973, 1974).

==== Undefeated/winning streaks ====
- Longest undefeated streak in all competitions: 57 matches, (47 wins, 10 draws). (Note: East Bengal remained unbeaten in 57 matches from the start of 1972 season, from 23 May 1972 until their 2–1 loss in the 16th match of 1973 Calcutta Football League against Khidirpore on 13 July 1973. East Bengal remained unbeaten in: 19 matches in 1972 Calcutta League, 4 matches in 1972 Bordoloi Trophy, 5 matches in 1972 IFA Shield, 7 matches in 1972 Durand Cup, 7 matches in 1972 Rovers Cup and 15 matches in the 1973 Calcutta League before losing against Khidirpore.) record.
- Longest undefeated streak in Calcutta Football League: 98 matches, (85 wins, 13 draws). (Note: East Bengal gave a walkover to Mohun Bagan in the 11th game of the 1968 Calcutta League on 21 September 1968. They won their next game 2–1 against Khidirpore on 9 August 1968 and since then, they were defeated once again after 5 years, in the 16th match of 1973 Calcutta League against Khidirpore 13 July 1973 by a 1–2 scoreline. In between these games, East Bengal played 98 matches in the Calcutta League where they won 85 and drew 13 of the matches without tasting a single defeat. The record of facing defeat by playing on-field dates further back as East Bengal lost 0–1 to Mohun Bagan in the last match of the 1967 Calcutta League on 10 September 1967. Since then, the Red and Gold brigade played 108 matches, where they won 94 and drew 14 of them.) record.
- Longest undefeated streak in Indian Super League: 10 matches, (5 wins, 5 draws). (Note: East Bengal remains undefeated for 10 consecutive matches in the 2025–26 season with 5 wins and 5 draws since their defeat against Jamshedpur in the third match.)
- Longest undefeated streak in NFL / I-League: 22 matches, (17 wins, 5 draws). (Note: East Bengal played their 18th match in the 2001-02 NFL on 27 March 2002 vs HAL, which they won 4–0 and continued their unbeaten run till their 17th match in the 2002-03 NFL on 1 March 2003 vs Tollygunge Agragami, which they won 2–0. They managed 17 wins and 5 draws in the unbeaten steak. East Bengal lost 2–0 against JCT on 5 March 2003 and thus ended their unbeaten run.) record.
- Longest undefeated streak in NFL / I-League in a single campaign: 17 matches, (13 wins, 4 draws). (Note: East Bengal remained unbeaten in the 2002-03 NFL from their first match on 8 December 2002 vs Mohun Bagan, which they won 2–0 and continued their unbeaten run till their 17th match on 1 March 2003 vs Tollygunge Agragami, which they won 2–0. They managed 13 wins and 4 draws in the unbeaten steak. East Bengal lost 2–0 against JCT on 5 March 2003 and thus ended their unbeaten run.)
- Longest winning streak in NFL / I-League: 6 matches (During the 2010-11 season). (Note: East Bengal won the first six matches in the 2010-11 I-League. They played their first match vs ONGC F.C. on 4 December 2010, in which they won 1–0 and continued their winning streak till their 6th match vs Air India F.C. on 29 December 2010, which they won 6–1. East Bengal drew 1–1 against Mumbai in their 7th match on 4 January 2011 and thus halted their winning streak.)
- Undefeated Calcutta Football League Champions: 19 times, (1950, 1970, 1971, 1972, 1974, 1975, 1977, 1982, 1987, 1991, 1993, 1996, 1999, 2000, 2012, 2015, 2016, 2017, 2024) record.
- Calcutta Football League Champions winning all matches: 3 times, (1975–76, 1977–78, 2016–17) record.

==== Records in National Football League and I-League ====
As of the end of 2019–20 season.

East Bengal league record in NFL/I-League
Season	Played	Won	Draw	Loss	GF	GA	GD	Points	Position	Ref
1996–97	5 (Note: Group Stage)	3	2	0	6	2	+4	11	Qualified for Championship stage	
1996–97	14	7	4	3	19	11	+8	25	3rd	
1997–98	18	8	7	3	18	10	+8	31	2nd	
1998–99	10 (Note: First Stage)	8	2	0	19	2	+17	26	Qualified for Second Stage	
1998–99	10	5	4	1	14	8	+6	19	2nd	
1999–00	22	8	8	6	25	21	+4	32	7th	
2000–01	22	13	7	2	30	9	+21	46	Champions	
2001–02	22	11	3	8	31	23	+8	36	5th	
2002–03	22	15	4	3	44	22	+22	49	Champions	
2003–04	22	15	4	3	37	13	+24	49	Champions	
2004–05	22	13	4	5	34	16	+18	43	3rd	
2005–06	17	9	4	4	25	16	+9	31	2nd	
2006–07	18	7	5	6	29	29	0	26	5th	
2007–08	18	5	4	9	17	23	−6	19	6th	
2008–09	22	7	7	8	31	26	+5	28	6th	
2009–10	26	7	10	9	27	31	−4	31	9th	
2010–11	26	15	6	5	44	21	+23	51	2nd	
2011–12	26	15	6	5	46	22	+24	51	2nd	
2012–13	26	13	8	5	44	18	+26	47	3rd	
2013–14	24	12	7	5	39	23	+16	43	2nd	
2014–15	20	8	5	7	30	28	+2	29	4th	
2015–16	16	7	4	5	22	18	+4	25	3rd	
2016–17	18	10	3	5	33	15	+18	33	3rd	
2017–18	18	8	7	3	32	19	+13	31	4th	
2018–19	20	13	3	4	37	20	+17	42	2nd	
2019–20	16	6	5	5	23	18	+4	20	cancelled (Note: The 2019–20 I-League was cancelled after 16 Rounds due to the COVID-19 pandemic. East Bengal FC was in second place when the league was cancelled.)	
TOTAL	500	248	133	119	756	464	+292	877		

==== Overall record in NFL/I-League ====
Statistics correct till end of 2019–20 I-League.

East Bengal overall league record in NFL/I-League
Competition	Home				Away				Total							
Competition	P	W	D	L	P	W	D	L	P	W	D	L	F	A	Win%	Notes
National Football League (1996–2007) (Tier-One)	114	77	25	12	110	45	33	32	224	122	58	44	331	182	54.46	(Note: Includes 5 matches from 1996–97 NFL First Stage and 10 matches from 1998–99 NFL Preliminary Stages.)
I-League (2007–2020) (Tier-One)	137	72	38	27	139	54	37	48	276	126	75	75	425	282	45.65	
Total	251	149	63	39	249	99	70	80	500	248	133	119	756	464	49.60	

==== Record in ISL ====
As of 7 November 2026

East Bengal league record in ISL
Season	Played	Won	Draw	Loss	GF	GA	GD	Points	Position	Play-offs	Ref
2020–21	20	3	8	9	22	33	−11	17	9th	Did not qualify	
2021–22	20	1	8	11	18	36	−18	11	11th	Did not qualify	
2022–23	20	6	1	13	22	38	−16	19	9th	Did not qualify	
2023–24	22	6	6	10	27	29	−2	24	9th	Did not qualify	
2024–25	24	8	4	12	27	33	-6	28	9th	Did not qualify	
2025–26	13	7	5	1	30	11	+19	26	Champions	Not Held	
2026–27	3	2	0	1	12	6	+6	6	6th	To be decided	
TOTAL	122	33	32	57	158	186	−32	131			

==== Overall Record in ISL ====
As of 7 November 2026

East Bengal overall league record in ISL
Competition	Home						Away						Total							
Competition	P	W	D	L	F	A	P	W	D	L	F	A	P	W	D	L	F	A	Win%	Notes
Indian Super League (2020–present) (Tier-One)	62	16	20	26	79	86	60	17	12	31	79	100	122	33	32	57	158	186	27.05	(Note: Due to the COVID-19 pandemic in India, the 2020–21 and 2021–22 Indian Super League season was held entirely in Goa, inside closed doors and East Bengal was allotted the Tilak Maidan Stadium as their home ground for both the seasons.) (Note: In 2023–24, the home match against Goa was shifted to Bhubaneshwar due to administrative issues.) (Note: In 2024–25, the away match against Mohun Bagan Super Giants was shifted to Guwahati due to administrative issues.) (Note: A single legged 2025–26 season was announced with no playoffs due to delays with restructuring of the league.) (Note: In 2025–26, the home match against Odisha was shifted to Goa due to Bengal elections.)

=== Goals ===
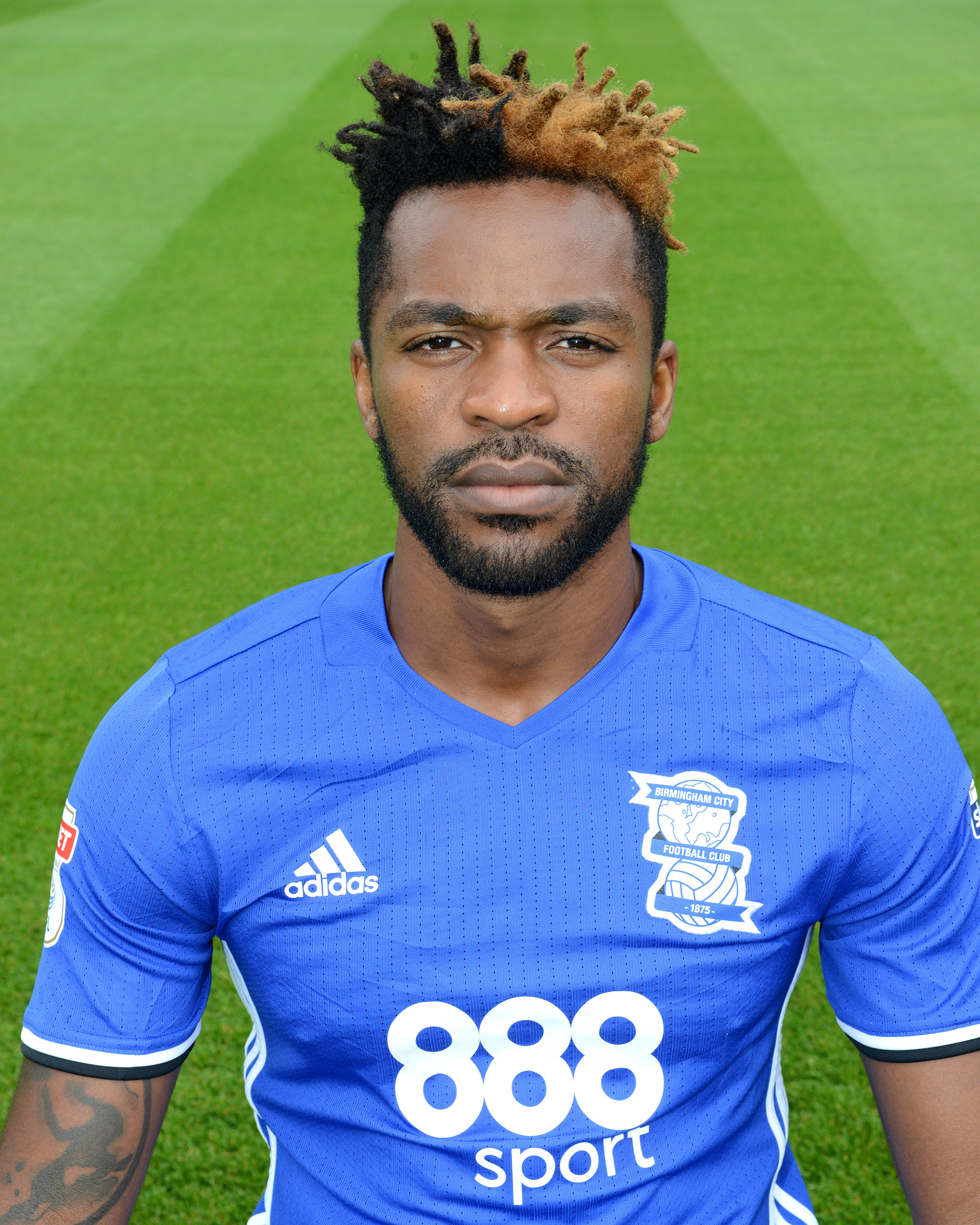
Jacques Maghoma scored the first ever goal for East Bengal in the Indian Super League against Hyderabad FC.

==== Firsts ====
- First goal in Calcutta League 2nd division: Arabinda Ghosh (against St. Xavier's, 1921).
- First goal in Calcutta League 1st division: Mona Dutta (against Calcutta FC, 9 May 1925).
- First goal in IFA Shield: Shashi Das (against Town Club, 1921).
- First goal in Durand Cup: Bhupen Das (against Army Headquarters, 1926).
- First goal in Rovers Cup: Sunil Ghosh (against Royal Navy, 1941).
- First goal in Federation Cup: Surajit Sengupta (against Rajasthan Police, 22 April 1978).
- First goal in NFL / I-League: Raman Vijayan (against Mohammedan Sporting, 17 December 1996).
- First goal in Indian Super League: Jacques Maghoma (against Hyderabad FC, 15 December 2020).
- First hat-trick by an East Bengal player: Dr. Ramesh Chandra Sen (against St. Xavier's, 10 May 1922, Calcutta Football League 2nd Division).
- First hat-trick by an East Bengal player in Calcutta League: Jatin Sarkar (against Rangers, 1927 Calcutta Football League).
- First hat-trick by an East Bengal player in NFL/I-League: Ossius Luiz Ferreira (against State Bank of Travancore, 15 February 2000, during the 1999-00 season).
- First hat-trick by an East Bengal player in Federation Cup: Chima Okorie (against Assam Police, during the 1990 Federation Cup - Eastern Zone qualifiers).
- First hat-trick by an East Bengal player in IFA Shield: N. Mazumdar (against Victoria Sporting, during the 1936 IFA Shield First-Round).
- First hat-trick by an East Bengal player in Durand Cup: K. P. Dhanraj (against Kalighat, during the 1951 Durand Cup Quarter-Final).
- First hat-trick by an East Bengal player in Rovers Cup: A. C. Somana (against Royal Navy, during the 1941 Rovers Cup First-Round).
- First hat-trick by an East Bengal player in Asian Club Championship: Biswajit Bhattacharya (against New Road Team, 2 August 1985, during the 1985 season).
- First hat-trick by an East Bengal player in Asian Cup Winners' Cup: Carlton Chapman (against Al-Zawra, 1 October 1993, during the 1993-94 season).
- First hat-trick by an East Bengal player in AFC Cup: Ernest Jeremiah (against Nebitçi Balkanabat, 25 May 2005, during the 2005 season).
- First golden-goal by an East Bengal player: Bhaichung Bhutia (against Mohammedan Sporting, 6 November 1994, Durand Cup Semi-Final).

==== Records ====
- Most goals scored in an Indian Super League season: 30 in 13 matches (during the 2025–26 season).
- Most goals scored in an NFL/I-League season: 46 in 26 games (during the 2011–12 season).
- Most goals scored in a Calcutta League season: 77 in 26 games (during the 1949–50 season).
- Fewest goals conceded in an Indian Super League season: 11 in 13 games (during the 2025–26 season).
- Fewest goals conceded in an NFL/I-League season: 9 in 22 games (during the 2000–01 season).
- Fewest goals conceded in a Calcutta Football League season: 0 in 19 and 18 games (During the 1972–73 and 1991–92 season).
- Fewest goals conceded in a Federation Cup campaign: 0 in 5 games (during the 2009–10 season).
- Most individual scorers in a single NFL/I-League match: 6 (against United Sikkim, during the 2012–13 season).

=== Club's ISL top scorers ===
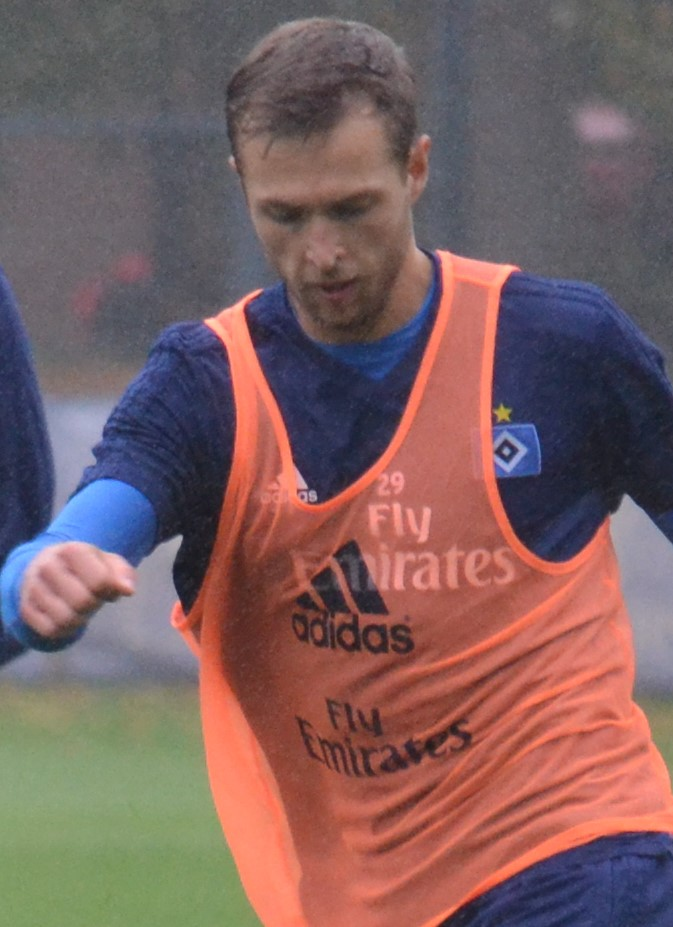
Matti Steinmann, top scorer for East Bengal in the 2020–21 Indian Super League season.

Top scorers for East Bengal in each season:
^{*} Current season

As of 21 May 2026

Golden boot winner

Top scorer for East Bengal in ISL
Season	Nationality	Name	Goals
2020–21	Germany	Matti Steinmann	4
2021–22	Croatia	Antonio Perošević	4
2022–23	Brazil	Cleiton Silva	12
2023–24	Brazil	Cleiton Silva	8
2024–25	India	P. V. Vishnu	4
2024–25	India	David Lalhlansanga	4
2024–25	Greece	Dimitrios Diamantakos	4
2025–26	Spain	Youssef Ezzejjari	11

=== Top scorers in NFL/I-League ===
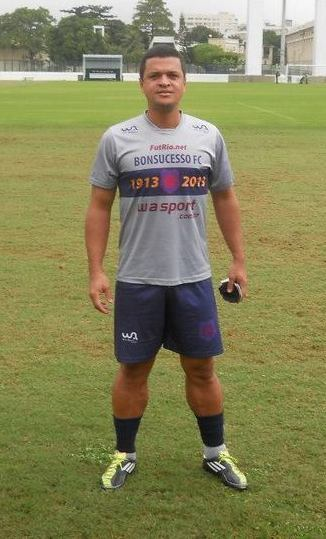
Edmilson Marques Pardal

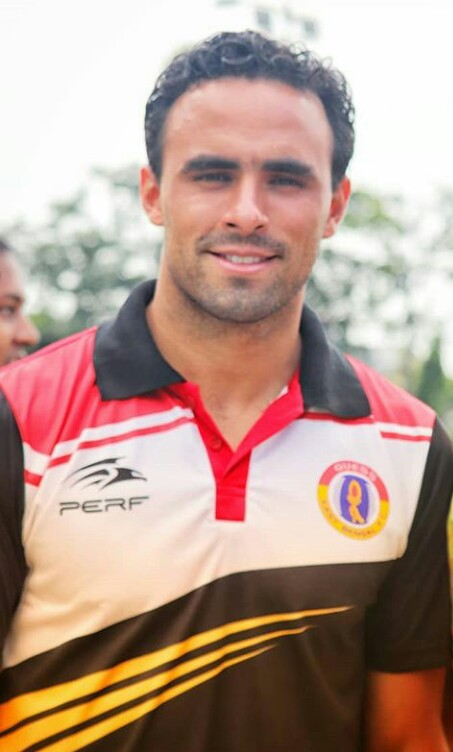
Enrique Esqueda with East Bengal in 2018.

Top scorers for East Bengal in each season:

Golden boot winner

Top scorer for East Bengal in NFL/I-League
Season	Nationality	Name	Goals
1996-97	India	Raman Vijayan	9
1997-98	India	Bhaichung Bhutia	8
1998-99	India	Raman Vijayan	10
1999-00	Ghana	Willie Brown	4
1999-00	Brazil	Ossius Luiz Ferreira	4
1999-00	India	Dipankar Roy	4
2000-01	Nigeria	Omolaja Olalekan	8
2001-02	Nigeria	Omolaja Olalekan	7
2002-03	Nigeria	Mike Okoro	17
2003-04	Brazil	Cristiano Júnior	15
2004-05	India	Bhaichung Bhutia	9
2005-06	India	Bhaichung Bhutia	12
2006-07	Brazil	Edmilson Marques Pardal	13
2007-08	Brazil	Edmilson Marques Pardal	8
2008-09	Ghana	Yusif Yakubu	11
2009-10	Ghana	Yusif Yakubu	9
2010-11	Australia	Tolgay Özbey	17
2011-12	Australia	Tolgay Özbey	18
2012-13	Nigeria	Chidi Edeh	18
2013-14	Nigeria	Chidi Edeh	9
2014-15	Nigeria	Ranti Martins	17
2015-16	Nigeria	Ranti Martins	12
2016-17	Trinidad and Tobago	Willis Plaza	9
2017-18	Nigeria	Dudu Omagbemi	8
2018-19	India	Jobby Justin	9
2018-19	Mexico	Enrique Esqueda	9
2019-20	Spain	Marcos de la Espada	6
2019-20	Spain	Jaime Santos	6

==== Hat-tricks in NFL/I-League ====
List of all hat-tricks for East Bengal in the NFL and I-League:

Hat-tricks for East Bengal in NFL/I-League
Season	Date	Nationality	Name	Against	Final score
1999–00	15 February 2000	Brazil	Oseías Luíz Ferreira	State Bank of Travancore	3 – 0
2002–03	25 January 2003	India	Alvito D'Cunha	HAL	3 – 5
2002–03	8 February 2003	Nigeria	Mike Okoro	HAL	4 – 1
2005–06	18 March 2006	India	Bhaichung Bhutia	Sporting Club de Goa	4 – 3
2010–11	4 April 2011	Australia	Tolgay Özbey	Air India	3 – 0
2011–12	23 November 2011	Australia	Tolgay Özbey^{4}	HAL	1 – 8
2012–13	5 January 2013	Nigeria	Chidi Edeh	Salgaocar	4 – 1
2014–15	1 March 2015	Nigeria	Ranti Martins^{5}	Dempo	1 – 5
2015–16	9 February 2016	Nigeria	Ranti Martins	Shillong Lajong	4 – 0
2015–16	12 March 2016	Nigeria	Ranti Martins	Aizawl F.C.	2 – 3
2016–17	29 January 2017	Haiti	Wedson Anselme	Minerva Punjab	0 – 5
2017–18	24 February 2018	Nigeria	Dudu Omagbemi^{4}	Chennai City F.C.	7 – 1
2018–19	14 February 2019	India	Laldanmawia Ralte	Shillong Lajong	5 – 0

^{4} Scored 4 Goals
^{5} Scored 5 Goals

=== Attendances ===
- Record highest attendance in a match: 1,31,785 (against Mohun Bagan in the 1997–98 Federarion Cup semifinal).
- Highest league home attendance in Indian Super League: 60,102 (against ATK Mohun Bagan in the 2022–23 season).
- Highest home attendance in Continental matches: 50,000 (against Al–Kuwait in the 2013 AFC Cup).
- Lowest league home attendance in Indian Super League: 1,982 (against NorthEast United in the 2022–23 season).

== Kolkata Derby ==
=== Firsts ===
- First Derby match: East Bengal 0–0 Mohun Bagan (8 August 1921, Cooch Behar Cup).
- First Derby win: East Bengal 2–1 Mohun Bagan (26 August 1921, Khogendra Shield Final).
- First Derby match in official tournament: East Bengal 1–0 Mohun Bagan (28 May 1925, Calcutta Football League).
- First Derby at Eden Gardens: East Bengal 2–1 Mohun Bagan (25 June 1967, Calcutta Football League).
- First Derby at Salt Lake Stadium: East Bengal 1–0 Mohun Bagan (28 September 1984, IFA Shield Final).
- First Derby at Kanchenjunga Stadium: East Bengal 0–0 Mohun Bagan (12 January 1988, Exhibition Match).

First Kolkata Derbies in Major Tournaments
Tournament	Date	Round	Score	East Bengal Scorers	Mohun Bagan Scorers	Ref
Calcutta Football League	28 May 1925	—	1–0	Nepal Chakraborty	—	
IFA Shield	5 August 1944	Semi Final	1–0	Vishweshwar Rao	—	
Durand Cup	28 December 1957	Semi Final	0–0	—	—	
Durand Cup	30 December 1957	Semi Final (Replay)	3–2	Moosa (2), Balasubramaniam	Chuni Goswami, Nimai Mukherjee	
Rovers Cup	27 November 1960	Semi Final	2–1	Arun Ghosh, B. Narayan	Amiya Bannerjee	
Federation Cup	7 May 1978	Final	0–0	—	—	
National Football League	6 January 1998	—	1–2	Felix Ijabandenyi	Chima Okorie, Dipendu Biswas	
I-League	30 December 2007	—	0–1	—	Bhaichung Bhutia	
Indian Super League	27 November 2020	—	0–2	—	Roy Krishna, Manvir Singh	.

Win Draw Loss

=== Goalscoring ===
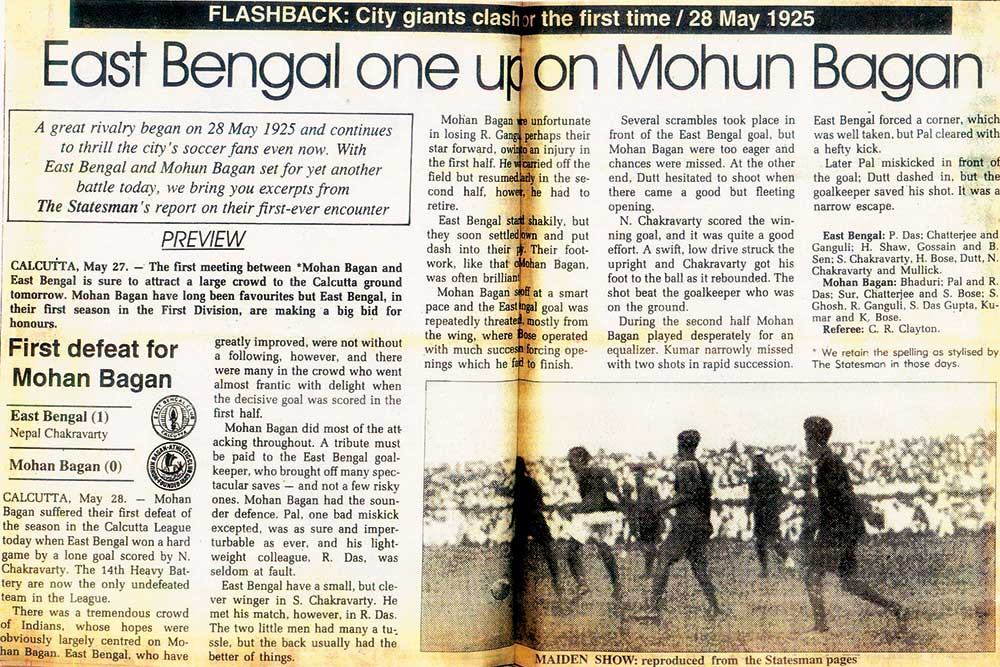
First official Kolkata Derby news report

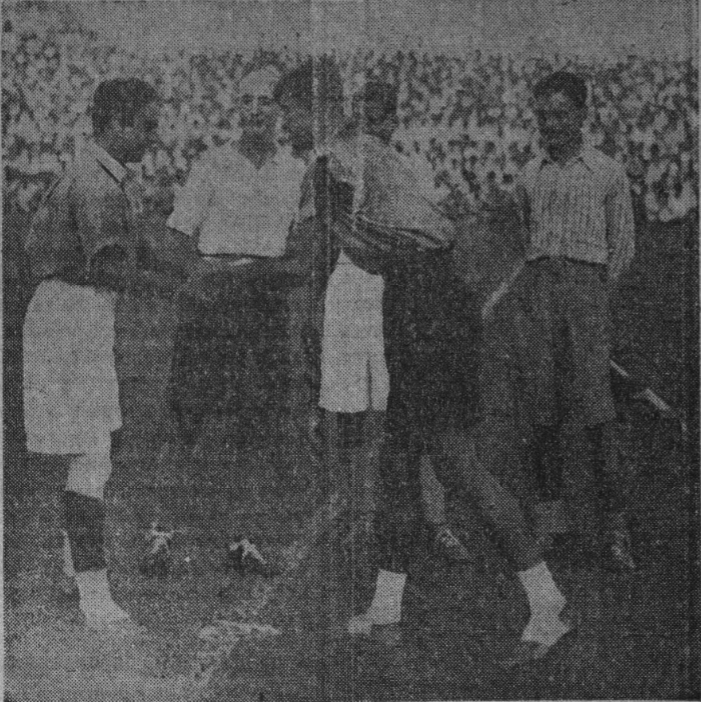
11 August 1945 - IFA Shield Final - East Bengal captain Paritosh Chakraborty and Mohun Bagan captain Anil Dey before the match.

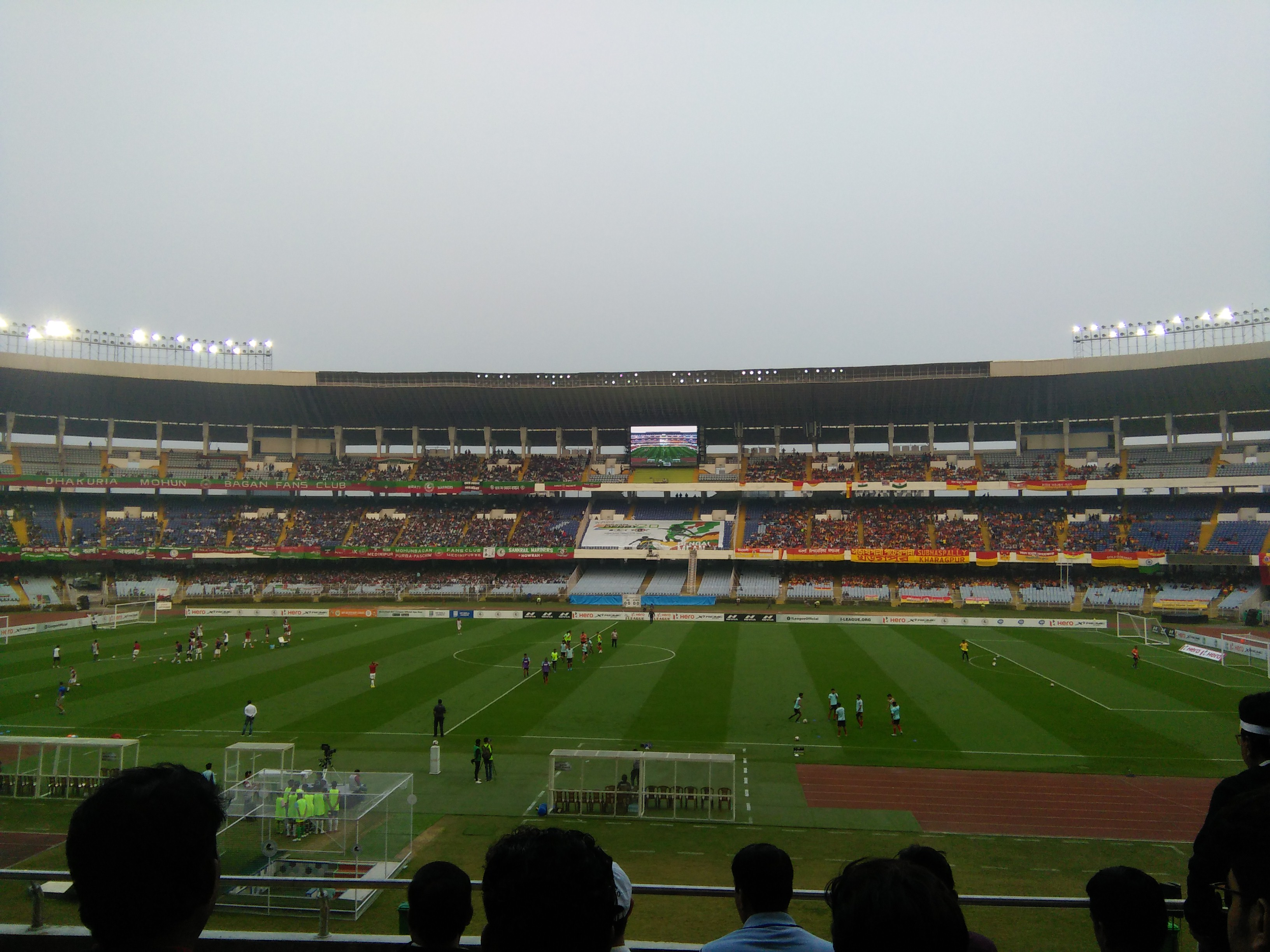
Kolkata Derby match at the Salt Lake Stadium on 19 January 2020 in the I-League.

- First Goal in Derby: Nosa Sen (East Bengal 2–1 Mohun Bagan, 26 August 1921, Khogendra Shield Final).
- First Goal in Calcutta Football League Derby: Nepal Chakraborty (East Bengal 1–0 Mohun Bagan, 28 May 1925).
- First Goal in IFA Shield Derby: Vishweshwar Rao (East Bengal 1–0 Mohun Bagan, 5 August 1944).
- First Goal in NFL/I-league Derby: Felix Abayomi (East Bengal 1–2 Mohun Bagan, 6 January 1998).
- First Goal in Indian Super League Derby: Tiri (o.g.) (Mohun Bagan 3–1 East Bengal, 19 February 2021).
- Most Goals in Derby: Bhaichung Bhutia, 13.
- Most Goals in NFL / I-League Derby: Syed Rahim Nabi, 4.
- Most Goals in Federation Cup Derby: Bhaichung Bhutia, 5.
- Hattrick in Derby:

Bhaichung Bhutia (East Bengal 4–1 Mohun Bagan, 13 July 1997, Fed Cup Semi Final).
Edmund Lalrindika (East Bengal 4–1 Mohun Bagan Super Giant, 23 August 2026, Durand Cup Final).

=== Win Records ===
- Biggest Victory: East Bengal 5–0 Mohun Bagan, 30 September 1975 (IFA Shield Final).
- Biggest Victory in Calcutta Football League Derby:

East Bengal 4–0 Mohun Bagan, 23 May 1936.
East Bengal 4–0 Mohun Bagan, 6 September 2015.

- Biggest Victory in Durand Cup Derby: East Bengal 4–1 Mohun Bagan, 23 August 2026.
- Biggest Victory in Rovers Cup Derby: East Bengal 3–0 Mohun Bagan, 25 December 1969.
- Biggest Victory in Federation Cup Derby: East Bengal 4–1 Mohun Bagan, 13 July 1997.
- Biggest Victory in NFL/I-League Derby: East Bengal 3–0 Mohun Bagan, 22 February 2009.
- Most consecutive Derby undefeated: 17 (1932 Days, (Note: East Bengal lost to Mohun Bagan, first time since their 3-1 defeat in the IFA Shield Final on 20 September 1969, after 1932 days, on 5 January 1975, in the Durand Cup Semi Final at the Ambedkar Stadium, Delhi by 1-0.) from 25 December 1969, Rovers Cup Final to 29 September 1974, IFA Shield Final).
- Derby Doubles in NFL/I-League: 3 (During the 2002–03, 2003–04, 2018–19 seasons).

=== Overall Derby Record ===
As of matches played on 8 October 2026

Overall Kolkata Derby head-to-head record
Competition	Matches played	East Bengal wins	Mohun Bagan wins	Draws
National Football League / I-League / Indian Super League (Note: Consists of both league winners shield and champions trophy.)	56	17	24	15
Federation Cup / Super Cup	24	9	6	9
Calcutta Football League (Note: Includes 8 Walkover Matches.)	166	58	47	61
IFA Shield (Note: Includes 1 Walkover Match.)	43	21	9	13
Durand Cup	25	11	9	5
Rovers Cup	12	4	4	4
All Airlines Gold Cup	10	7	1	2
Delhi Cloth Mills Trophy	1	1	0	0
Scissors Cup	2	0	2	0
McDowell Cup	2	1	1	0
Bordoloi Trophy	1	0	1	0
Darjeeling Gold Cup	3	1	0	2
Horendra Mukherjee Memorial Shield	2	1	0	1
Amrita Bazar Centenary Cup	1	0	1	0
Peerless Trophy	1	0	1	0
Mohun Bagan Centenary Cup	1	0	0	1
Nehru Centenary Cup	1	1	0	0
J. C. Guha Trophy	1	0	0	1
Shibdas Bhaduri Memorial Trophy	1	0	1	0
SSS Trophy	1	0	0	1
PNB Centenary Trophy	1	0	1	0
Kalinga Cup	1	1	0	0
Md. Sporting Platinum Jubilee Cup	1	1	0	0
Cooch Behar Cup	10	2	4	4
Khogendra Shield	1	1	0	0
Raja Memorial Shield	1	0	1	0
Gladstone Cup	1	0	1	0
Darbhanga Shield	3	0	3	0
William Younger Challenge Cup	3	0	2	1
Lady Hardinge Shield	5	1	4	0
Trades Cup	2	0	1	1
Chandicharan Shield	2	1	1	0
Competitive Matches Total (including walkovers)	385	139	125	121
Exhibition Games	27	6	11	10
All Time Total	412	145	136	131

East Bengal has 6 W/O wins over Mohun Bagan and Mohun Bagan has 3 W/O wins over East Bengal.

=== Mini Kolkata Derby Record ===
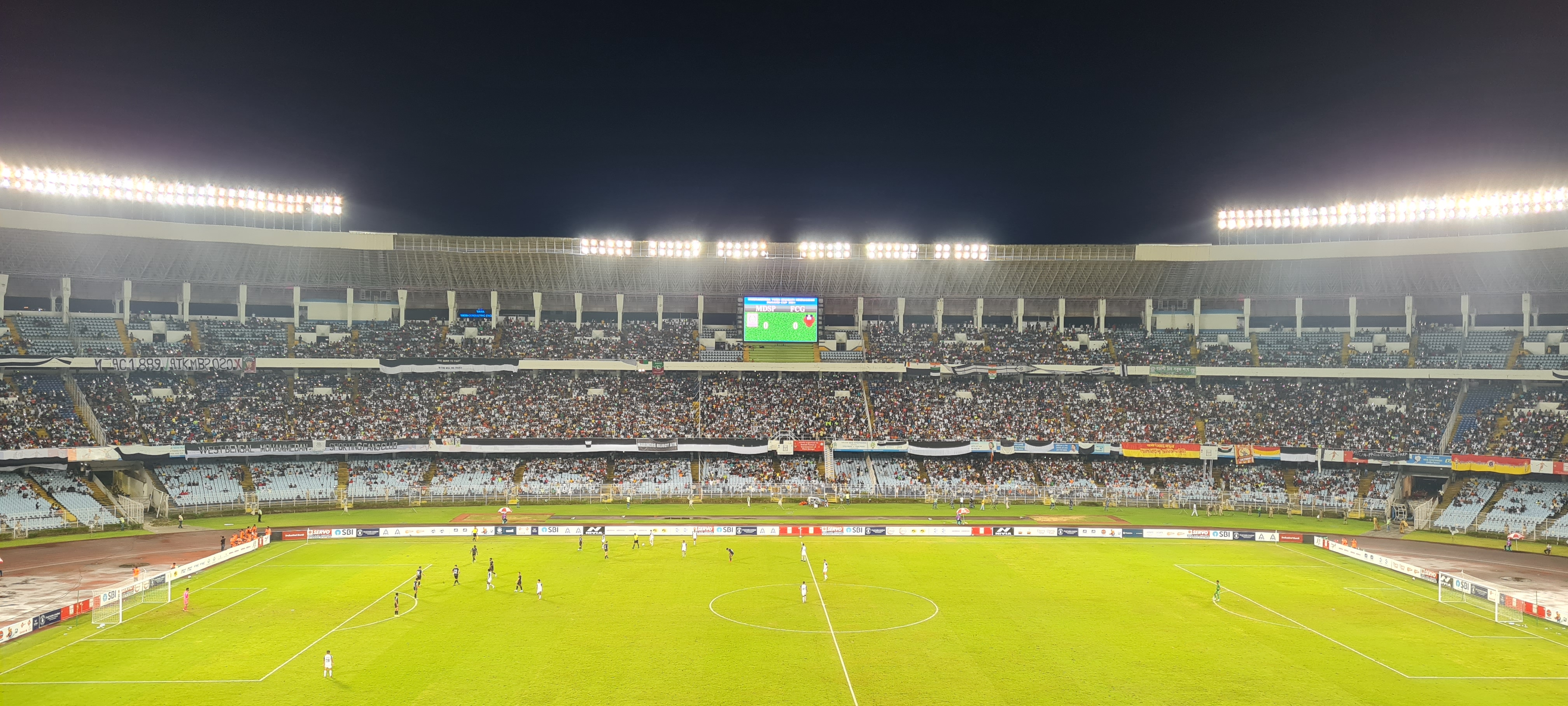
East Bengal vs Mohammedan Sporting

East Bengal also has a minor rivalry against another giant from Kolkata — Mohammedan SC. The rivalry started in the mid—1930s when Mohammedan won five consecutive Calcutta Football League titles between 1934 and 1938, while East Bengal finished runner-up in three of those seasons. East Bengal managed to overtake Mohammedan and bettered their record in the 1970s by winning the league for six consecutive seasons from 1970 to 1975. In 1980, the rivalry took another fresh revival as thirteen East Bengal players moved to Mohammedan in a mass exodus from the club. However, East Bengal still managed to build a strong team and eventually win the 1980 Rovers Cup jointly with Mohammedan after the game ended 1–1. In the 1990s, East Bengal slowly moved the tide to their favour as the National Football League started and East Bengal remains unbeaten against Mohammedan in the top-tier league in India till date.

==== Goalscoring Records ====
- Highest margin of victory: East Bengal 7–0 Mohammedan, 23 March 2026 (Indian Super League).
- Highest margin of defeat: Mohammedan 5–1 East Bengal, 8 January 1960 (Durand Cup).
- Most goals against Mohammedan Sporting: Bhaichung Bhutia, 12.
- Most goals in a single game against Mohammedan Sporting: Tolgay Ozbey, 4, 14 May 2012 (During the 2011–12 Calcutta Football League).
- First hat—trick against Mohammedan Sporting: Tulsidas Balaram (26 September 1959, Semi—Final, IFA Shield).

==== Overall record ====
As of 14 September 2026

Overall Head to Head record
Competition	Matches Played	East Bengal wins	Draws	Mohammedan wins	Goal scored EB	Goal scored MDS
Indian Super League	3	2	1	0	10	1
I-League	4	2	2	0	7	4
National Football League	7	7	0	0	16	3
Federation Cup	12	4	5	3	16	11
Durand Cup	6	2	2	2	6	8
IFA Shield	23	9	7	7	29	17
Rovers Cup	10	3	4	3	7	7
Calcutta Football League	144	75	37	32	216	104
2nd Div Calcutta Football League	5	3	2	0	9	2
DCM Trophy	10	6	1	3	12	5
Bordoloi Trophy	4	1	0	3	3	4
All Airlines Gold Cup	9	6	0	3	14	10
Stafford Challenge Cup	2	0	2	0	1	1
Darjeeling Gold Cup	3	2	0	1	1	0
McDowell's Cup	3	3	0	0	5	1
Sikkim Gold Cup	3	0	0	3	0	2
JC Guha Trophy	1	1	0	0	1	0
SSS Trophy	2	2	0	0	6	2
Nehru Club Cup	1	0	0	1	1	2
Kalinga Cup	1	1	0	0	0	0
Charms Cup	1	0	0	1	1	2
PNB Centenary Trophy	1	1	0	0	2	1
Scissors Cup	1	0	1	0	1	1
Sait Nagjee Football Tournament	2	1	0	1	1	1
Peerless Trophy	1	0	1	0	1	1
Amrita Bazar Centenary	1	1	0	0	1	0
Brabourne Cup	1	0	0	1	0	1
Platinum Jubilee Cup	1	1	0	0	1	0
Competitive Matches Total	262	133	65	64	368	191

== International ==
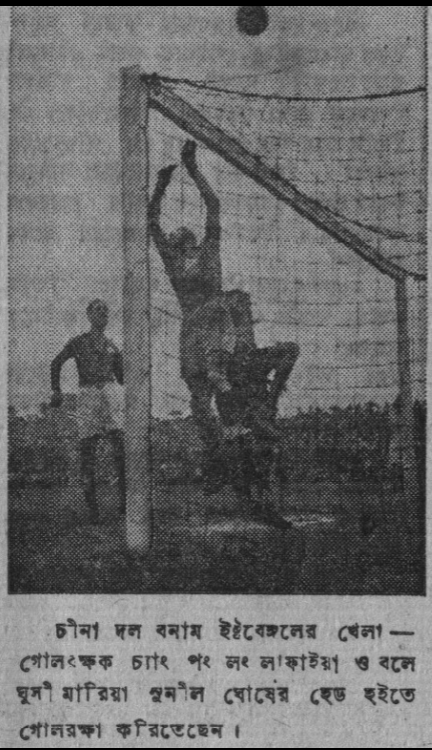
14 July 1948 - East Bengal vs China Olympic Team in action - photo from Jugantor newspaper 15 July 1948.

=== Continental record ===
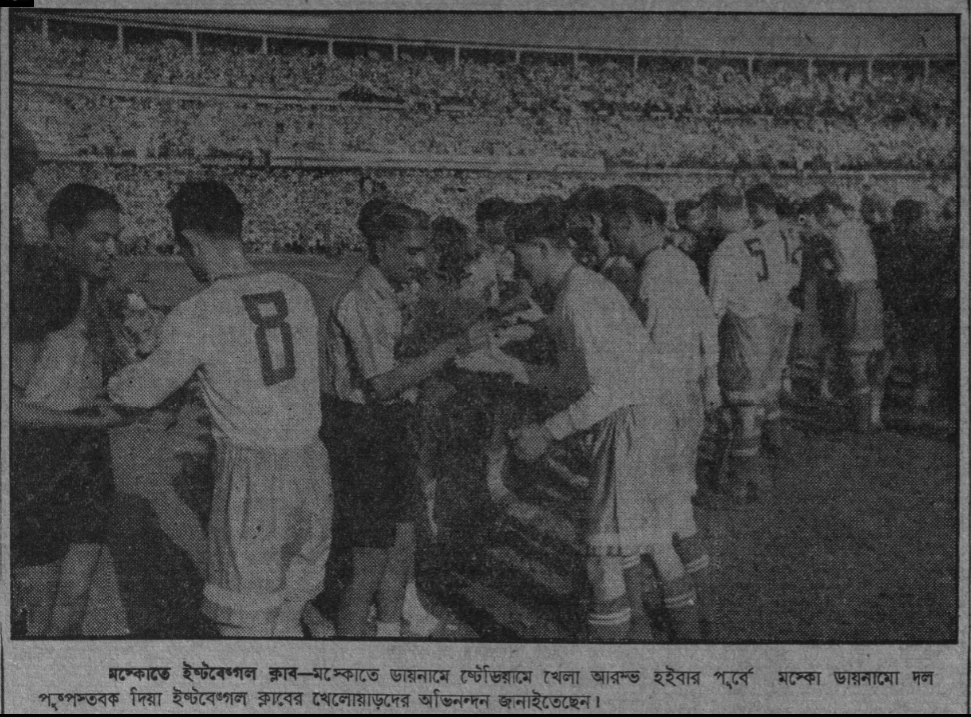
21 August 1953 - East Bengal vs Torpedo Moscow, Central Dynamo Stadium, Moscow - photo from Jugantor newspaper 22 September 1953.

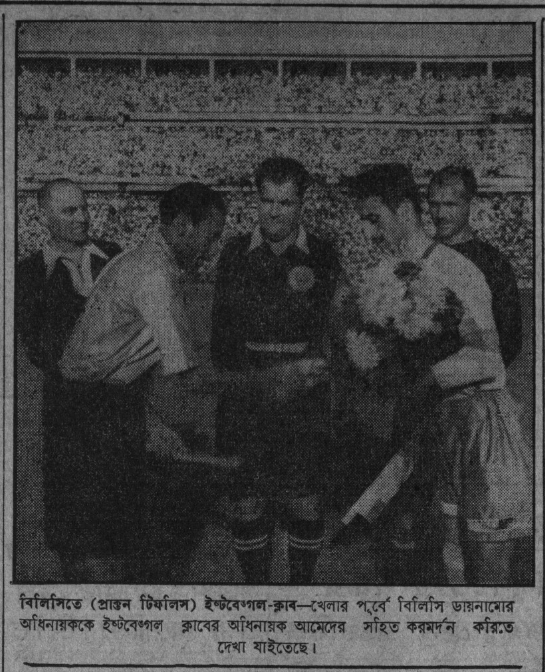
Ahmed Khan, captain of East Bengal and Avtandil Gogoberidze, the captain of Dynamo Tbilisi before the match - photo from Jugantor newspaper 23 September 1953.

Competition	Appearances	Seasons	Best result
Coca-Cola Cup (Central Asia)	1	1985	Champions
Asian Club Championship	2	1985–86, 1998–99	Group stage
Asian Cup Winners' Cup	5	1991–92, 1993–94, 1994–95, 1995, 1997–98	Quarter-finals (1991-92)
AFC Cup / AFC Champions League Two	10	2004, 2005, 2008, 2010, 2011, 2012, 2013, 2015, 2024–25, 2026–27	Semi-finals (2013)
AFC Challenge League	1	2024–25	Quarter-finals (2024–25)

=== Invitational tournaments ===
Apart from AFC tournaments, East Bengal club have participated in several invitational tournaments on foreign soil and have been victorious on three occasions.

Season	Country	Competition	Result
1953-54	Romania	1953 World Youth Festival	Fourth place
1991-92	Bangladesh	1991 BTC Club Cup	Semi-finals
1993-94	Nepal	1993 Wai Wai Cup	Champions
1996-97	Nepal	1996 Coca Cola Cup	Semi-finals
1996-97	Bangladesh	1996 Bangabandhu Cup	Group stages
2003-04	Indonesia	2003 ASEAN Club Championship	Champions
2004-05	England	2004 Pepsi Max Challenge Cup	Fourth place
2004-05	Nepal	2004 San Miguel International Cup	Champions
2011-12	Vietnam	2011 BTV Becamex IDC Cup	Group stages
2015-16	Bangladesh	2015 Sheikh Kamal International Club Cup	Runners-up

=== Firsts ===
- First match against foreign opponent: East Bengal 2–0 China Olympic XI, 14 July 1948 (Friendly Match, Kolkata).
- First competitive match against foreign opponent: Grazer AK 0–2 East Bengal, 6 August 1953 (1953 World Youth Festival, Bucharest).
- First win in a final at home: East Bengal 1–0 PAS Tehran, 25 September 1970 (IFA Shield, Kolkata).
- First win in a final away from home: Ranipokhari Corner Team 0–1 East Bengal, 15 June 1993 (Wai Wai Cup, Nepal).
- First match in Asian Club Championship: East Bengal 7–0 New Road Team, 1 August 1985 (During the 1985-86 season).
- First match in Asian Cup Winners' Cup: Abahani KC 0–0 East Bengal, 1 September 1991 (During the 1991-92 season).
- First match in AFC Cup: Geylang United 2–3 East Bengal, 10 February 2004 (During the 2004 season).
- First match in AFC Champions League Two: East Bengal 2–3 Altyn Asyr, 14 August 2024 (During the 2024–25 season).
- First match in AFC Challenge League: East Bengal 2–2 Paro, 26 October 2024 (During the 2024–25 season).

=== Records ===
- Total Matches played in AFC competitions: 88.
- Matches played in Asian Club Championship: 9.
- Matches played in Asian Cup Winners' Cup: 18.
- Matches played in AFC Cup / AFC Champions League Two: 56.
- Matches played in AFC Challenge League: 5.
- Most Appearances by a player in AFC Cup: 34, Mehtab Hossain.
- Most Goals against foreign opponents: 25, Bhaichung Bhutia.
- Most Goals in AFC competitions: 11, Bhaichung Bhutia.
- Most Goals in Asian Club Championship: 8, Debasish Roy.
- Most Goals in Asian Cup Winners' Cup: 8, Bhaichung Bhutia.
- Most Goals in AFC Cup: 6, Cristiano Júnior and Chidi Edeh.
- Most Goals in AFC Challenge League: 4, Dimitrios Diamantakos.
- Most consecutive wins against foreign opponents: 8 Matches (2003–04) (Note: East Bengal won consecutive 8 matches against foreign opponents between 16 July 2003, when the defeated Philippine Army FC in the 2003 ASEAN Club Championship to 21 April 2004, when they defeated Island FC in the 2004 AFC Cup.)
- Most Goals by a player in a match against foreign opponents: 6, Bhaichung Bhutia (against Philippine Army, 2003 ASEAN Club Championship).
- Biggest win against foreign opponents: East Bengal 9–0 Club Valencia, 10 August 1985 (1985 Coca-Cola Cup).
- Biggest win in Asian Cup Winners' Cup: East Bengal 8–0 Tribhuvan Club, 15 August 1997 (during the 1997-98 season).
- Biggest win in AFC Cup: East Bengal 5–1 Yangon United, 15 May 2013 (during the 2013 season).
- Biggest win in AFC Challenge League: East Bengal 4–0 Bashundhara Kings, 29 October 2024 (during the 2024–25 season).

==== Overall record ====
As of 3 November 2026

East Bengal Club overall record against foreign opponents
Tournament	P	W	D	L	GF	GA	GD	Win %
Asian Club Championship (Note: Includes record for the Coca-Cola Cup 1985, which was organized as a preliminary qualification tournament for the 1985-86 Asian Club Championship.)	9	5	1	3	21	10	+11	55.56
Asian Cup Winners' Cup	18	7	1	10	31	33	−2	38.89
AFC Cup/AFC Champions League Two	61	16	14	31	81	115	−34	26.23
AFC Challenge League	5	2	1	2	10	7	+3	40.00
AFC Tournaments Total	93	30	17	46	143	165	−22	32.26
All Airlines Gold Cup	8	6	1	1	23	2	+21	75.00
ASEAN Club Championship	5	4	0	1	12	4	+8	80.00
Bangabandhu Cup	2	0	0	2	1	4	−3	0.00
Bordoloi Trophy	7	4	1	2	19	10	+9	57.14
BTC Club Cup	3	1	1	1	3	3	+0	33.33
BTV Becamex IDC Cup	3	0	1	2	2	4	−2	0.00
Charms Cup	1	0	1	0	0	0	+0	0.00
Coca-Cola Cup	3	1	0	2	3	5	−2	33.33
Darjeeling Gold Cup	1	0	0	1	0	1	−1	0.00
DCM Trophy	26	8	4	14	24	37	−13	30.77
Durand Cup	3	1	2	0	5	3	+2	33.33
Governor's Gold Cup	3	2	0	1	5	2	+3	66.67
IFA Shield	26	17	4	5	42	18	+24	65.38
JC Guha Trophy	2	1	0	1	5	1	+4	50.00
Mohun Bagan Centenary Cup	2	0	1	1	1	2	−1	0.00
Nehru Centenary Club Cup	2	0	0	2	0	2	−2	0.00
P. K. Nair Gold Cup	1	1	0	0	1	0	+1	100.00
Pepsi Max Challenge Cup	2	0	0	2	0	4	−4	0.00
Rovers Cup	2	2	0	0	4	1	+3	100.00
San Miguel Cup	4	3	0	1	3	2	+1	75.00
Scissors Cup	3	0	1	2	2	4	−2	0.00
Sheikh Kamal Cup	5	3	1	1	9	5	+4	60.00
Stafford Cup	1	1	0	0	1	0	+1	100.00
Tea Planters' Association Trophy	1	1	0	0	1	0	+1	100.00
Wai Wai Cup	5	3	2	0	8	3	+5	60.00
World Youth Festival	4	2	0	2	10	10	+0	50.00
Total in competitive matches	218	91	37	90	327	292	+35	41.74
Friendlies	48	17	9	22	66	105	−39	35.42
Total	266	108	46	112	393	397	−4	40.60

Last updated: 12 March 2025
Source: East Bengal against Foreign Opponents

== Bibliography ==
Books

- Goswami, Ramesh Chandra (1963). East Bengal Cluber Itihas (in Bengali). Kolkata: Book Garden.
- Bandyopadhyay, Santipriya (1979). Cluber Naam East Bengal (in Bengali). Kolkata: New Bengal Press.
- Chattopadhyay, Hariprasad (2017). Mohun Bagan-East Bengal (in Bengali). Kolkata: Parul Prakashan.
- Saha, Rupak (2000). Itihase East Bengal (in Bengali). Kolkata: Deep.
- Saha, Rupak (2020). East Bengal - Prothom Eksho Bochor (in Bengali). Kolkata: The Cafe Table. ISBN 978-93-89873-21-4.
