= Surajit Sengupta =

Indian footballer (1951–2022)

সুরজিৎ সেনগুপ্ত
Personal information
- Date of birth: 30 August 1951
- Place of birth: Hooghly, West Bengal, India
- Date of death: 17 February 2022 (aged 70)
- Place of death: Kolkata, West Bengal, India
- Position: Winger

Senior career*
Years	Team	Apps	(Gls)
1971	Kidderpore		
1972–1974	Mohun Bagan		
1974–1980	East Bengal		
1980–1981	Mohammedan Sporting		
1981–1983	Mohun Bagan		

International career
1973–1979	India	14	(1)
- * Club domestic league appearances and goals

Surajit Sengupta (30 August 1951 – 17 February 2022) was an Indian footballer who played as a winger.

He played for the India national team, representing the country in the 1974 Asian Games in Tehran and the 1978 Asian Games in Bangkok. In a domestic career spanning twelve years between 1971 and 1983, he had represented all three of Calcutta's football clubs, Mohun Bagan FC, East Bengal FC, and Mohammedan Sporting FC, and was considered one of the finest forwards of his time. Sengupta won the IFA Shield and the Calcutta Football League six times each and the Durand Cup thrice while representing East Bengal FC.

He appeared with East Bengal from 1974 to 1980 and captained the team in 1978–79. He received the lifetime achievement award from East Bengal in 2018.

== Early life ==
Sengupta was born on 30 August 1951, in Chakbazar in the Hooghly district of West Bengal. His father, Suhas Sengupta, was a football and cricket player who worked for Dunlop India. Sengupta studied at the Hooghly Branch School where he was spotted by coach Ashwini Barat. He went on to study at the Hooghly Mohsin College and made his second division debut for Robert Hudson FC.

== Club career ==
Sengupta made his domestic debut playing for the Kidderpore club in 1971 before moving to Mohun Bagan AC and playing for the club between 1972 and 1974. He was part of Mohun Bagan's Bangladesh tour in May 1972, where they defeated Dhaka Mohammedan and lost to Dhaka XI. He later moved to East Bengal FC for six seasons between 1974 and 1980. He represented Mohammedan SC between 1980 and 1981 before returning to Mohan Bagan between 1981 and 1983.

Amongst his best experiences was a 1975 IFA Shield Final where he led East Bengal's 5–0 win against their Kolkata rivals Mohun Bagan. Most of his victories came during his time with East Bengal FC. He was also the captain of the West Bengal team in the 1976 Santosh Trophy. In a domestic career spanning twelve years he represented all three of Calcutta's football clubs and had won the IFA Shield and the Calcutta Football League six times each and the Durand Cup thrice for East Bengal FC.

Sengupta received the lifetime achievement award from East Bengal in 2018.

== International career ==
Sengupta made his debut for the India national team in 1974 in a game against Thailand in the Merdeka Cup in Kuala Lumpur. He represented the country in 14 games, including the 1974 Asian Games in Tehran and the 1978 Asian Games in Bangkok. He also represented the country in the 1974 Merdeka Cup and the 1977 President's Cup in Seoul.

== Style of play ==
Sengupta played as winger and was known for his playing speed and passing range. Per an article in the Indian newspaper The Hindu, he was considered one of the finest and creative forwards of his time.

== Personal life and death ==
Sengupta was married to Shyamali Sengupta, with whom he had a son. After his retirement he was involved with the game as a sports editor with a Bengali language magazine writing their football columns. He learnt singing and would play the Tabla with his son. East Bengal coach and former Indian footballer P. K. Banerjee had named him Sócrates after the Brazilian footballer, given his sporting a beard and his varied interests. He also acted in the Bengali film Raasta directed by Bratya Basu in 2003.

Sengupta died from COVID-19-related complications on 17 February 2022, at the age of 70.

== Honours ==
East Bengal

- Calcutta Football League: 1974, 1975, 1977
- DCM Trophy: 1974
- IFA Shield: 1974, 1975, 1976
- Darjeeling Gold Cup: 1976
- Federation Cup: 1978–79
- Rovers Cup: 1973–74, 1975–76
- Durand Cup: 1978
- Bordoloi Trophy: 1978

== See also ==
- List of SC East Bengal captains

== Bibliography ==
- Kapadia, Novy (2017). Barefoot to Boots: The Many Lives of Indian Football. Penguin Random House. ISBN 978-0-143-42641-7.
- Martinez, Dolores; Mukharji, Projit B (2009). Football: From England to the World: The Many Lives of Indian Football. Routledge. ISBN 978-1-138-88353-6. Archived from the original on 2 July 2022.
- Nath, Nirmal (2011). History of Indian Football: Upto 2009–10. Readers Service. ISBN 9788187891963. Archived from the original on 22 July 2022.
- "Triumphs and Disasters: The Story of Indian Football, 1889—2000" (PDF). Archived from the original (PDF) on 13 August 2012.
- Mukhopadhay, Subir (2018). সোনায় লেখা ইতিহাসে মোহনবাগান (transl. Mohun Bagan in the history written in gold). ISBN 978-93-850172-0-9.
- Banerjee, Argha; Basu, Rupak (2022). মোহনবাগান: সবুজ ঘাসের মেরুন গল্প (transl. Mohun Bagan: Green fields' Maroon stories). Shalidhan. ISBN 978-81-954667-0-2.
- Roy, Gautam (1 January 2021). East Bengal 100. Allsport Foundation. ISBN 978-8194763109.
- Bandyopadhyay, Santipriya (1979). Cluber Naam East Bengal (in Bengali). Kolkata: New Bengal Press.
- Chattopadhyay, Hariprasad (2017). Mohun Bagan–East Bengal (in Bengali). Kolkata: Parul Prakashan.
