= 1975 IFA Shield final =

- Event: 1975 IFA Shield
East Bengal	Mohun Bagan
5	0
- Date: 30 September 1975
- Venue: Mohun Bagan Ground, Kolkata, West Bengal
- Man of the Match: Shyam Thapa
- Attendance: 30,000 (approx.)

The 1975 IFA Shield final was the 79th final of the IFA Shield, the second oldest football competition in India, and was contested between Kolkata giants East Bengal and Mohun Bagan on 30 September 1975 at the Mohun Bagan Ground in Kolkata.

East Bengal won the final 5–0 to claim their 14th IFA Shield title. Shyam Thapa scored a brace while Surajit Sengupta, Ranjit Mukherjee and Subhankar Sanyal scored one each as East Bengal defeated their arch-rivals Mohun Bagan in a record margin to lift their fourth consecutive IFA Shield title.

== Route to the final ==
=== East Bengal ===
Date	Round	Opposition	Score
23 September 1975	Quarter-Final	Police AC	5–0
26 September 1970	Semi Final	Behala Youth	7–0

East Bengal entered the 1975 IFA Shield as the three times defending champions, and started their campaign directly from the quarter-final stage. East Bengal faced Police AC in the last eight and defeated them 5–0 with Surajit Sengupta scoring a hattrick for the team while Samaresh Chowdhury and Shyam Thapa scored the other two. In the semi-final, East Bengal faced Behala Youth and won 7–0 with Surajit Sengupta scoring four goals and Ranjit Mukherjee, Pradip Dutta and Subhankar Sanyal scoring one each as East Bengal reached the IFA Shield final for the twenty-second time.

=== Mohun Bagan ===
Date	Round	Opposition	Score
25 September 1975	Quarter-Final	Kalighat Club	w/o
27 September 1970	Semi Final	Tollygunge Agragami	4–1

Mohun Bagan entered the 1975 IFA Shield as one of the Kolkata giants and was supposed to start their campaign directly from the quarter-finals against Kalighat Club however, Kalighat had informed the Indian Football Association about their inability to field a team and Mohun Bagan received a walkover into the semi-finals. In the semi-final, Mohun Bagan defeated Tollygunge Agragami 4–1 with Sisir Guha Dastidar scoring twice and Bijoy Dikpati and Johor Das scoring one each as Mohun Bagan reached the finals. Srikumar Chakraborty scored the only goal for Tollygunge in the defeat.

== Match ==
=== Details ===
30 September 1975
15:00 IST

East Bengal	5–0	Mohun Bagan
Sengupta 6'; Thapa (penalty missed) 14', 24', 50'; Mukherjee 38'; Sanyal 84'	Report

Mohun Bagan Ground, Kolkata, West Bengal
Attendance: 35,000 (est.)
Referee: Babul Barmese (Assam)

East Bengal	Mohun Bagan

GK	(India) Tarun Bose
RB	(India) Sudhir Karmakar
CB	(India) Ashokelal Banerjee (c)
CB	(India) Shyamal Ghosh
LB	(India) Kajal Dhali	(substituted off) 75'
CM	(India) Gautam Sarkar
CM	(India) Samaresh Chowdhury
LF	(India) Surajit Sengupta
RF	(India) Subhash Bhowmick
ST	(India) Ranjit Mukherjee
ST	(India) Shyam Thapa	(substituted off) 80'
Substitutes:
LB	(India) Mridul Mutsuddi	(substituted in) 75'
ST	(India) Subhankar Sanyal	(substituted in) 80'
Coach:
(India) P. K. Banerjee

GK	(India) Bhaskar Ganguly	(substituted off) 51'
RB	(India) Bijoy Dikpati
CB	(India) Nimai Goswami	(substituted off) 75'
CB	(India) Subrata Bhattacharya
LB	(India) Dilip Palit
CM	(India) Tapan Bose
CM	(India) Prasun Banerjee
LF	(India) Narayanswami Ulaganathan
RF	(India) Kesto Mitra
ST	(India) Johor Das
ST	(India) Sisir Guha Dastidar (c)
Substitutes:
GK	(India) Prasanta Mitra	(substituted in) 51'
CB	(India) Compton Dutta	(substituted in) 75'
Coach:
(India) Arun Ghosh

Hero of the Match:
Shyam Thapa (East Bengal)

Match rules

- 90 minutes.

== See also ==
- IFA Shield Finals
