= Gorkha Stadium =

Multi-purpose stadium in Lebong, Darjeeling, India

Coordinates: 27.051531°N 88.277875°E

- Interactive map of Gorkha Stadium
- Location: Darjeeling, West Bengal, India
- Owner: Darjeeling Gorkha Hill Sports Association
- Capacity: 15,000

Construction
- Built: 1993

Gorkha Stadium is a multi-purpose stadium in Lebong, Darjeeling, India. It has a seating capacity of 15,000, and is used for football (most notably Darjeeling Gold Cup), cricket, and various events. Gorkha Stadium was built in 1993.
