= Narayanswami Ulaganathan =

Indian footballer

Personal information
- Date of birth: 1952 (age 73–74)
- Place of birth: Bangalore, Mysore State, India
- Position: Winger

Youth career
- 1969: Bangalore Mars
- 1970: Army Football Club, 515
- 1971–1974: Chief Inspectorate of Electronics

Senior career*
Years	Team	Apps	(Gls)
1974–1976	Mohun Bagan		
1976–1979	East Bengal		
1979–1983	Mohun Bagan		
1983–1984	Mohammedan		
1984–1985	Mohun Bagan		

International career
1972–1977	India		
- * Club domestic league appearances and goals

Narayanswami Ulaganathan (born 1952) is an Indian former footballer. He played for Mohun Bagan in three spells, East Bengal, Mohammedan and the India national team primarily as a winger, during his 12-year career as a professional footballer.

Playing for the Mariners in 1976, he became the first player to score a hat-trick in the Durand Cup final, which came against JCT Mills. Nicknamed "Black Pearl", Ulaganathan was renowned for his speed with the ball and footwork as a winger, and was considered one of India's best wingers during his time. He was notable in not having received a single yellow card throughout his career. He retired from professional football in 1985.

== Childhood and early career ==
Ulaganathan was born in 1952 into a Tamilian family in Gautamapura, Austin Town, a locality in Bangalore, of the erstwhile Mysore State (now Karnataka). He played cricket, football, gilli-danda and marbles as a child. Growing up in Gautamapura, a locality that was named 'mini Brazil', as it was home to Arumoy Naigam, Kannan, both established footballers at the time, Ulaganathan was influenced by them, before taking to football seriously when he was 16.

His football career started in 1969 when he began playing for a local Bangalore club, Bangalore Mars. After a year with Mars, he moved to Army Base team, 515, an army team. Following this he played a striker for another army team, Chief Inspectorate of Electronics (CIL), for three seasons, till 1974. During the time, he also represented his home state, Mysore (now Karnataka), in the Santosh Trophy, from 1968 to 1973. As a senior professional, he got his first break in 1972, when he was called for the national selection camp in Calcutta (now Kolkata) for the Olympics qualifiers in Rangoon. Having been selected, he played at the tournament.

== Career ==
=== Mohun Bagan ===
Sailen Manna, a former Mohun Bagan player was told of Ulaganathan's talent by Arumoy Naigam and Kannan, who tried to sign him for Bagan during the national selection camp in 1972. However, he was not released by his then club and employer CIL, for, the rules said, he had to apply for a transfer six months in advance. However, he signed for Bagan in 1974. He had an ordinary first season with Bagan finishing the season third behind rivals East Bengal and Aryan. Having had a difficult start at the club, he considered leaving the club at the time. This was until Durand Cup of the season came. Bagan beat Bengal in the semifinals, with Ulaganathan scoring a late winner through a header with three minutes left. The 1–0 win broke Bengal's losing streak of 1,932 days against them. Facing JCT Mills in the finals in Delhi, he scored a hat-trick in the team's win 3–2, with Bagan winning the Cup after ten years. In the process, he became the first player to score a hat-trick in a Durand Cup final. The following season proved to be ordinary for both Ulaganathan and the team, failing to win a single trophy and also losing to Bengal 5–0 in the IFA Shield final.

In his next season, on 24 July 1976, in the game against Bengal, Ulaganathan assisted Mohammad Akbar in scoring a goal in 14 seconds from start. Receiving the delivery from defender Prasun, he beat Bengal defender Sudhir Karmakar, to pass the ball to Akbar who scored what was one of the fastest league goals, and the fastest Calcutta derby goal. He finished the season winning a unique treble with the team; the IFA League, IFA Shield and the Rovers Cup, and also the Bordoloi Trophy, with Pradip Kumar Banerjee as the coach.

=== East Bengal ===
With Bagan signing Bengal forward Shyam Thapa, Ulaganathan made a move to Bengal having received a good offer, in 1976. In his first season with Bengal, he helped the team the IFA League. In the 1977 season, he finished with 9 goals, the highest in his career in a season. In the 1978–79 season, he won his second Durand Cup title and also helped the team win its first Federation Cup, after the team played out a draw with Bagan 0–0, hence being declared joint winners.

=== Return to Mohun Bagan and later career ===
Ulaganathan returned to his former club Mohun Bagan in 1979. He had Xavier Pius as his strike partner, both of whom would go on to win many trophies together, during their time at Bagan. During his second spell at Bagan, Ulaganathan won the IFA League in 1979 and 1983, Durand Cups in 1979, 1980 and 1982, and IFA Shield Cups in 1979, 1981 and 1982 along with two Federation Cup titles.

In 1983, following four seasons with Bagan, Ulaganathan signed for another Calcutta club, Mohammedan Sporting. Once there, he helped his team win the Federation Cup, his fourth. Sporting beat Mohun Bagan 2–0 in the final, with both goals scored by Jamshid Nassiri, with assists from Ulaganathan. After a season with Sporting, he returned to his former club, Mohun Bagan, in 1984. Having played one season with bagan, he retired in 1985.

== International career ==
Ulaganathan made his first appearance for the India national team at the Olympic qualifiers in Rangoon. He was then called up for the 1973 Merdeka Cup, when he scored his first goal for India, in a match against Cambodia, a match that India won 3–0. In the quarterfinal against Malaysia, he injured his shinbone following a collision with a player that made him to sit out of the team for six months. He was member of the squad that took part at the 1974 Asian Games in Tehran and the 1977 goodwill tour of Zambia.

== Personal life ==
Ulaganathan married Arati Palit, the cousin of his then teammate Dilip Palit, in 1979. They have a son, Abhishek, who played football like his father, but did not take it professionally. He has been employed with Bengal Chemicals since 1979, and currently in its Bangalore office, in the marketing department. He resides in Fraser Town, a locality in Bangalore, with his family in his house named "Soccer Ville".

== Honours ==
East Bengal

- Federation Cup: 1978–79

== Bibliography ==
- Kapadia, Novy (2017). Barefoot to Boots: The Many Lives of Indian Football. Penguin Random House. ISBN 978-0-143-42641-7.
- Martinez, Dolores; Mukharjiim, Projit B (2009). Football: From England to the World: The Many Lives of Indian Football. Routledge. ISBN 978-1-138-88353-6. Archived from the original on 2 July 2022.
- Majumdar, Boria, Bandyopadhyay, Kausik (2006). Goalless: The Story of a Unique Footballing Nation. Penguin India. ISBN 9780670058747.
- Nath, Nirmal (2011). History of Indian Football: Upto 2009–10. Readers Service. ISBN 9788187891963. Archived from the original on 22 July 2022.
- Dineo, Paul; Mills, James (2001). Soccer in South Asia: Empire, Nation, Diaspora. London, United Kingdom: Frank Cass Publishers. ISBN 978-0-7146-8170-2. Archived from the original on 25 July 2022.
- Majumdar, Boria; Bandyopadhyay, Kausik (2006). A Social History Of Indian Football: Striving To Score. Routledge. ISBN 9780415348355. Archived from the original on 29 June 2021.
- Basu, Jaydeep (2003). Stories from Indian Football. UBS Publishers' Distributors. ISBN 9788174764546. Archived from the original on 11 October 2022.
- "Triumphs and Disasters: The Story of Indian Football, 1889—2000" (PDF). Archived from the original (PDF) on 13 August 2012.
- Mukhopadhay, Subir (2018). সোনায় লেখা ইতিহাসে মোহনবাগান (transl. Mohun Bagan in the history written in gold). ISBN 978-93-850172-0-9.
- Banerjee, Argha; Basu, Rupak (2022). মোহনবাগান: সবুজ ঘাসের মেরুন গল্প (transl. Mohun Bagan: Green fields' Maroon stories). Shalidhan. ISBN 978-81-954667-0-2.
- Roy, Gautam (1 January 2021). East Bengal 100. Allsport Foundation. ISBN 978-8194763109.
- Chattopadhyay, Hariprasad (2017). Mohun Bagan–East Bengal (in Bengali). Kolkata: Parul Prakashan.
