= Darjeeling Gold Cup =

- Organiser(s): Darjeeling Gorkha Hills Sports Association
- Founded: 1975; 51 years ago
- Region: India
- Teams: 13
- Current champions: East Bengal (II) (5th title)
- Most championships: East Bengal (5 titles)

All India Darjeeling Gold Cup, also known as All India Brigade of Gorkha's Gold Cup Football Tournament, or simply GTA Chairman's Gold Cup, is an Indian football tournament held in Darjeeling and organized by the Indian Darjeeling Gorkha Hill Sports Association (DGHSA). The tournament debuted in 1975. Apart from some top clubs from the Calcutta Football League, clubs from other Indian states also participated in the tournament. All matches are held at Gorkha Stadium in Darjeeling.

== Results ==
List of Darjeeling Gold Cup finals
Year	Winners	Score	Runners-up	Ref.
1975	Mohun Bagan	–		
1976	East Bengal and Mohun Bagan (joint winners)			
1977	George Telegraph	–		
1978	Eastern Railway and Premier Tyres (Kochi) (joint winners)			
1979	Mohun Bagan	–		
1980	BSF Jalandhar	–		
1981	East Bengal	3–2	Mohun Bagan	
1982	East Bengal and Mohun Bagan (joint winners)			
1983	Nepal XI	–		
1984	Mohammedan Sporting	–		
1985	East Bengal	–		
2010	Army XI	2–0	Southern Samity	
2011	Tata Football Academy	–	United Sikkim	
2014	ONGC	5–0	Dalhousie	
2018	East Bengal (II)	0–0, (3–1 p)	Mohammedan	
