= List of East Bengal FC matches against foreign opponents =

East Bengal is an Indian association football club based in Kolkata, West Bengal, which competes in the top tier of Indian football. The club was formed when the vice-president of Jorabagan, Suresh Chandra Chaudhuri, resigned when Jorabagan sent out their starting eleven but with the notable exclusion of defender Sailesh Bose who was dropped from the squad for reasons not disclosed when they were about to face Mohun Bagan in the Coochbehar Cup Semi-Final on 28 July 1920. He along with Raja Manmatha Nath Chaudhuri, Ramesh Chandra Sen, and Aurobinda Ghosh, formed East Bengal, in the Jorabagan home of Suresh Chandra on 1 August 1920; 99 years ago. East Bengal started playing in the Calcutta Football League 2nd division from 1921 and in 1925 they qualified for the first division for the first time and since then they have won numerous titles in Indian Football.

East Bengal joined the National Football League since its inception in 1996 and is the only club to play all seasons till date, even after its name change to I-League in 2007. East Bengal has won the National Football League thrice: 2000–01, 2002–03, and 2003–04 and became runners-up 7 times, the most number of times by any Indian football club. Among other trophies, East Bengal has won the Calcutta Football League 39 times, IFA Shield 28 times, Federation Cup 8 times, and the Durand Cup 16 times. Since its establishment in 1920, East Bengal has won several trophies, both in the domestic as well as in international arena and its record against foreign opponents has been impressive.

This chronological list comprises all the matches played by East Bengal Club against foreign opposition in all competitive and non-competitive fixtures since their foundation in 1920. Each entry includes the name of the tournament, the stage at which the fixture was played, the date of the match, the name and nationality of the opponent team, the match result, the scorers for East Bengal, the venue, and the city at which the game was played.

== List of all matches against foreign opponents ==
As of 3 November 2026

Keys
The symbols and colours used below:
- Win
- Draw
- Loss
- Finals with this background and symbol in the "Round" column are the finals won by East Bengal in a tournament.
- P = matches played; W = matches won; D = matches drawn; L = matches lost; Win% = percentage of total matches won.

List of all matches against foreign opponents for East Bengal Club
Sl no.	Competition	Round	Date	Nat.	Opposition	Score	Scorers for EB	Venue	City	Refs
1	Friendly	—	13 October 1937	(Myanmar)	Burma XI	0–6	—	BAA Ground	Rangoon	
2	Friendly	—	15 October 1937	(Myanmar)	Non Burmese XI	2–1	N. Mazumdar (2)	BAA Ground	Rangoon	
3	Friendly	—	18 October 1937	(Myanmar)	Burma XI	4–2	Samad, Murgesh (2), Joseph	BAA Ground	Rangoon	
4	Friendly	—	20 October 1937	(Myanmar)	Burma XI	0–1	—	BAA Ground	Rangoon	
5	Friendly	—	22 October 1937	(Myanmar)	Burma XI	0–0	—	BAA Ground	Rangoon	
6	Friendly	—	14 July 1948	(Taiwan)	China	2–0	M. Apparao, P. B. A. Saleh	Calcutta Ground	Kolkata	
7	Friendly	—	12 October 1948	(Myanmar)	Burma Athletic Association XI	0–5	—	BAA Ground	Rangoon	
8	Friendly	—	14 October 1948	(Myanmar)	Burma Athletic Association XI	2–3	—	BAA Ground	Rangoon	
9	Friendly	—	17 October 1948	(Myanmar)	Burma Athletic Association XI	0–5	—	BAA Ground	Rangoon	
10	Friendly	—	04 December 1949	(Sweden)	Helsingborgs IF	0–2	—	Calcutta Ground	Kolkata	
11	Friendly	—	5 October 1950	(Pakistan)	Governor's XI	1–0	M. Apparao	DSA Ground	Dhaka	
12	Friendly	—	6 October 1950	(Pakistan)	GOC XI	1–1	Ahmed Khan	DSA Ground	Dhaka	
13	Friendly	—	22 November 1951	(Sweden)	IFK Göteborg	1–0	P. B. A. Saleh	Calcutta Ground	Kolkata	
14	Friendly	—	25 November 1951	(Pakistan)	Governor's XI	3–1	K. P. Dhanraj (2), P. B. A. Saleh	DSA Ground	Dhaka	
15	Friendly	—	26 November 1951	(Pakistan)	Prime Minister's XI	0–2	—	DSA Ground	Dhaka	
16	Friendly	—	24 May 1952	(Pakistan)	Dhaka XI	1–3	K. P. Dhanraj	DSA Ground	Dhaka	
17	Friendly	—	25 May 1952	(Pakistan)	Dhaka XI	4–0	K. P. Dhanraj (3), P. Venkatesh	DSA Ground	Dhaka	
18	Friendly	—	20 June 1953	(West Germany)	Kickers Offenbach	0–1	—	Calcutta Ground	Kolkata	
19	World Youth Festival	First Round	06 August 1953	(Austria)	Grazer AK	2–0	M. Thangaraj (2)	Stadionul August 23	Bucharest	
20	World Youth Festival	Second Round	09 August 1953	(Lebanon)	Lebanon XI	6–1	M. Thangaraj (3), Ahmed Khan, P. Venkatesh, Masood Fakhri	Stadionul August 23	Bucharest	
21	World Youth Festival	Semi Final	12 August 1953	(Romania)	Romania XI	0–4	—	Stadionul August 23	Bucharest	
22	World Youth Festival	Third-Place Play-off	15 August 1953	(West Germany)	West Germany XI	2–5	Masood Fakhri, M. Thangaraj	Stadionul August 23	Bucharest	
23	Friendly	—	21 August 1953	(Soviet Union)	Torpedo Moscow	3–3	M. Thangaraj, P Venkatesh (2)	Central Dynamo Stadium	Moscow	
24	Friendly	—	25 August 1953	(Soviet Union)	Dynamo Tbilisi	1–9	M. Thangaraj	Beria Dinamo Stadium	Tbilisi	
25	Friendly	—	01 September 1953	(Soviet Union)	Dynamo Moscow	0–6	—	Central Dynamo Stadium	Moscow	
26	Friendly	—	06 September 1953	(Soviet Union)	Dynamo Kyiv	1–13	Jagannath Kittu	Republican Stadium	Kyiv	
27	Friendly	—	05 March 1955	(Soviet Union)	USSR	0–3	—	East Bengal Ground	Kolkata	
28	P. K. Nair Gold Cup	Semi Final	04 May 1956	(Pakistan)	Makrans	1–0	Jagannath Kittu	Mananchira Maidan	Kozhikode	
29	Friendly	—	20 November 1964	(Hungary)	Tatabánya	1–5	Prasanta Sinha	Calcutta Ground	Kolkata	
30	Friendly	—	11 August 1969	(South Korea)	Yangzee	0–4	—	Ambedkar Stadium	Delhi	
31	IFA Shield	Final	25 September 1970	(Iran)	PAS Tehran	1–0	Parimal Dey	Eden Gardens	Kolkata	
32	DCM Trophy	Third Round	14 November 1971	(Nepal)	Kathmandu XI	4–0	Ashok Chatterjee, Swapan Sengupta, Samaresh Chowdhury, Mohammed Habib	Ambedkar Stadium	Delhi	
33	Bordoloi Trophy	Final	31 August 1972	(Bangladesh)	Dhaka XI	0–0	—	Nehru Stadium	Guwahati	
34	Bordoloi Trophy	Final (Replay)	01 September 1972	(Bangladesh)	Dhaka XI	5–1	Mohammed Habib (3), Latifuddin, Mohammed Akbar	Nehru Stadium	Guwahati	
35	IFA Shield	Semi Final	12 September 1972	(Malaysia)	Selangor	2–0	Shambhu Mitra (2)	East Bengal Ground	Kolkata	
36	Friendly	—	5 October 1972	(Bangladesh)	Dhaka XI	0–0	—	DSA Ground	Dhaka	
37	Friendly	—	6 October 1972	(Bangladesh)	Chittagong XI	1–0	na	Chittagong Ground	Chittagong	
38	Friendly	—	8 October 1972	(Bangladesh)	Rajshahi XI	3–1	na	Rajshahi Ground	Rajshahi	
39	Friendly	—	9 October 1972	(Bangladesh)	Khulna XI	1–0	na	Khulna Ground	Khulna	
40	Friendly	—	11 October 1972	(Bangladesh)	Dhaka XI	0–0	—	DSA Ground	Dhaka	
41	Friendly	—	20 April 1973	(Hong Kong)	Hong Kong Rangers	1–6	Subhash Bhowmick	Hong Kong Stadium	Happy Valley	
42	IFA Shield	Quarter Final	21 September 1973	(Malaysia)	Terengganu	3–0	Mohammed Akbar (2), Subhash Bhowmick	East Bengal Ground	Kolkata	
43	IFA Shield	Final	27 September 1973	(North Korea)	Pyongyang City	3–1	Mohammed Akbar (2), Subhash Bhowmick	East Bengal Ground	Kolkata	
44	DCM Trophy	Final	28 October 1973	(North Korea)	Dok Ro Gang	0–0	—	Ambedkar Stadium	Delhi	
45	DCM Trophy	Final (Replay)	29 October 1973	(North Korea)	Dok Ro Gang	0–0 (Note: Dok Ro Gang denied to play extra time and forfeited the match, East Bengal were announced as the winner.)	—	Ambedkar Stadium	Delhi	
46	IFA Shield	Semi Final	27 September 1974	(Bangladesh)	Abahani Krira Chakra	7–0	Sadek (o.g.), Subhash Bhowmick (2), Mohammed Akbar (2), Surajit Sengupta, Samaresh Chowdhury	East Bengal Ground	Kolkata	
47	DCM Trophy	QF Group Stage	13 October 1974	(South Korea)	Chohung Bank	3–2	Gautam Sarkar, Surajit Sengupta, Mohammed Habib	Ambedkar Stadium	Delhi	
48	DCM Trophy	Semi Final	16 October 1974	(Thailand)	Port Authority Bangkok	2–0	Surajit Sengupta (2)	Ambedkar Stadium	Delhi	
49	DCM Trophy	QF Group Stage	26 November 1975	(Thailand)	Port Authority Bangkok	4–3	Shyam Thapa (2), Surajit Sengupta, Kajal Mukherjee	Ambedkar Stadium	Delhi	
50	DCM Trophy	Final	02 November 1975	(South Korea)	Hanyang University	0–2	—	Ambedkar Stadium	Delhi	
51	Friendly	—	06 May 1976	(England)	Crook Town	1–1	Subhankar Sanyal	Eden Gardens	Kolkata	
52	Friendly	—	12 February 1977	(Uzbek Soviet Socialist Republic)	Pakhtakor Tashkent	0–1	—	Mohun Bagan Ground	Kolkata	
53	DCM Trophy	QF Group Stage	11 October 1977	(Malaysia)	Terengganu	1–1	Prasanta Banerjee	Ambedkar Stadium	Delhi	
54	Bordoloi Trophy	Final	05 September 1978	(Thailand)	Port Authority Bangkok	4–2	Surajit Sengupta (2), Mihir Bose (2)	Nehru Stadium	Guwahati	
55	IFA Shield	Semi Final	14 September 1978	(Armenian Soviet Socialist Republic)	Ararat Yerevan	0–1	—	Eden Gardens	Kolkata	
56	IFA Shield	Semi Final	11 September 1979	(South Korea)	South Korea XI	1–1 (4–3 p)	Surajit Sengupta	East Bengal Ground	Kolkata	
57	DCM Trophy	Semi Final	06 November 1980	(South Korea)	Bank of Seoul	0–3	—	Ambedkar Stadium	Delhi	
58	Stafford Cup	QF Group Stage	9 April 1981	(Iraq)	Iraqi Youth Club	1–0	na	Vyalikaval Ground	Bangalore	
59	DCM Trophy	QF Group Stage	26 October 1981	(Australia)	East Fremantle Tricolore	0–5	—	Ambedkar Stadium	Delhi	
60	DCM Trophy	QF Group Stage	21 December 1982	(South Korea)	Incheon University	1–1	Kartick Sett	Ambedkar Stadium	Delhi	
61	Darjeeling Gold Cup	Final	9 October 1983	(Nepal)	Nepal XI	0–1	—	Gorkha Stadium	Darjeeling	
62	DCM Trophy	QF Group Stage	13 November 1983	(South Korea)	Myongji University	2–2	Prasanta Banerjee (2)	Ambedkar Stadium	Delhi	
63	DCM Trophy	Semi Final	17 November 1983	(Australia)	Spearwood Dalmats	1–0	Krishnagopal Chowdhury	Ambedkar Stadium	Delhi	
64	IFA Shield	Semi Final	25 September 1984	(Thailand)	Bangkok Bank	1–0	Biswajit Bhattacharya	Salt Lake Stadium	Kolkata	
65	DCM Trophy	QF Group Stage	11 December 1984	(Bangladesh)	Abahani Krira Chakra	w/o	—	Ambedkar Stadium	Delhi	
66	DCM Trophy	QF Group Stage	15 December 1984	(China)	Liaoning	0–3	—	Ambedkar Stadium	Delhi	
67	Coca-Cola Cup (Note: The Central Asia Champions' Cup (Coca-Cola Cup) was the Preliminary Tournament held as qualifiers for the Central Asia zone with teams from India, Bangladesh, Sri Lanka, Nepal, and Pakistan for the 1985–86 Asian Club Championship. The tournament was organized in Colombo, Sri Lanka.)	Group Stage	02 August 1985	(Nepal)	New Road Team	7–0	Biswajit Bhattacharya (4), Debasish Roy (2), Birbhadra Pradhan (o.g.)	Sugathadasa Stadium	Colombo	
68	Coca-Cola Cup	Group Stage	05 August 1985	(Bangladesh)	Abahani Krira Chakra	1–0	Debasish Roy	Sugathadasa Stadium	Colombo	
69	Coca-Cola Cup	Group Stage	07 August 1985	(Pakistan)	PIA	2–0	Debasish Roy, Biswajit Bhattacharya	Sugathadasa Stadium	Colombo	
70	Coca-Cola Cup	Group Stage	10 August 1985	(Maldives)	Club Valencia	9–0	Debasish Roy (3), Jamshid Nassiri (2), Monojit Das (2), Samir Chowdhury, Debasish Mishra	Sugathadasa Stadium	Colombo	
71	Coca-Cola Cup	Group Stage	14 August 1985	(Sri Lanka)	Saunders	1–0	Jamshid Nassiri	Sugathadasa Stadium	Colombo	
72	IFA Shield	Group Stage	10 December 1985	(Uruguay)	Centro Atlético Fénix	0–0	—	Salt Lake Stadium	Kolkata	
73	IFA Shield	Semi Final	13 December 1985	(Uruguay)	Peñaroll	1–1 (2–4 p)	Aloke Mukherjee	Salt Lake Stadium	Kolkata	
74	DCM Trophy	Final	27 December 1985	(Australia)	South Australia	0–0 (4–5 p)	—	Ambedkar Stadium	Delhi	
75	Asian Club Championship	QF Group Stage	19 January 1986	(Saudi Arabia)	Al-Ahli	1–2	Debasish Roy	Prince Abdullah Stadium	Jeddah	
76	Asian Club Championship	QF Group Stage	21 January 1986	(Indonesia)	Krama Yudha Tiga Berlian	0–2	—	Prince Abdullah Stadium	Jeddah	
77	Governor's Gold Cup	Quarter Final	16 October 1986	(Bhutan)	Thimphu XI	1–0	Chibuzor Nwakanma	Paljor Stadium	Gangtok	
78	IFA Shield	Group Stage	10 December 1986	(Bangladesh)	Abahani Krira Chakra	1–0	Emeka Ezeugo	Salt Lake Stadium	Kolkata	
79	IFA Shield	Semi Final	17 December 1986	(Nigeria)	Leventis United	3–1	Biswajit Bhattacharya, Sudip Chatterjee, Ranjit Karmakar	Salt Lake Stadium	Kolkata	
80	DCM Trophy	Final	30 December 1986	(Ukrainian Soviet Socialist Republic)	Metalist Kharkiv	0–4	—	Ambedkar Stadium	Delhi	
81	JC Guha Trophy	Group Stage	10 May 1988	(Bangladesh)	Dhaka Mohammedan	5–0	Chima Okorie (3), Bikash Panji, Uttam Mukherjee	East Bengal Ground	Kolkata	
82	JC Guha Trophy	Semi Final	12 May 1988	(Bangladesh)	Dhaka Mohammedan	0–1	—	East Bengal Ground	Kolkata	
83	Friendly	—	14 November 1988	(Soviet Union)	Kuzbass Kemerovo	0–2	—	Salt Lake Stadium	Kolkata	
84	DCM Trophy	Final	18 November 1988	(South Korea)	POSCO Atoms	0–1	—	Ambedkar Stadium	Delhi	
85	DCM Trophy	QF Group Stage	05 November 1989	(Iran)	Esteghlal	0–1	—	Ambedkar Stadium	Delhi	
86	DCM Trophy	Semi Final	07 November 1989	(South Korea)	POSCO Atoms	0–2	—	Ambedkar Stadium	Delhi	
87	Nehru Centenary Club Cup	Group Stage	07 January 1990	(Denmark)	Lyngby	0–1	—	Salt Lake Stadium	Kolkata	
88	Nehru Centenary Club Cup	Group Stage	14 January 1990	(Paraguay)	Club Olimpia	0–1	—	Salt Lake Stadium	Kolkata	
89	DCM Trophy	QF Group Stage	31 October 1990	(Nepal)	Royal Nepal Airlines	2–0	Sudip Chatterjee, Bikash Panji	Ambedkar Stadium	Delhi	
90	DCM Trophy	Semi Final	06 November 1990	(South Korea)	Kyung Hee University	0–0 (2–3 p)	—	Ambedkar Stadium	Delhi	
91	Rovers Cup	Semi Final	17 November 1990	(Bahrain)	East Riffa Club	1–0	Chima Okorie	Cooperage Ground	Mumbai	
92	Mohun Bagan Centenary Cup	Group Stage	22 November 1990	(Cameroon)	Diamant Yaoundé	0–0	—	Salt Lake Stadium	Kolkata	
93	Mohun Bagan Centenary Cup	Final	26 November 1990	(Cameroon)	Diamant Yaoundé	1–2	Babu Mani	Salt Lake Stadium	Kolkata	
94	BTC Club Cup	QF Group Stage	31 May 1991	(Bangladesh)	Brothers Union	1–0	Bikash Panji	Bangabandhu Stadium	Dhaka	
95	BTC Club Cup	QF Group Stage	02 June 1991	(Bangladesh)	Dhaka Mohammedan	1–1	Prasanta Banerjee	Bangabandhu Stadium	Dhaka	
96	BTC Club Cup	Semi Final	04 June 1991	(Bangladesh)	Abahani Krira Chakra	1–2	Krishanu Dey	Bangabandhu Stadium	Dhaka	
97	Durand Cup	QF Group Stage	20 October 1991	(Bangladesh)	Bangladesh Army	0–0	—	Ambedkar Stadium	Delhi	
98	Asian Cup Winners' Cup	First Round	01 September 1991	(Bangladesh)	Abahani Krira Chakra	0–0	—	Bangabandhu Stadium	Dhaka	
99	Asian Cup Winners' Cup	First Round	08 September 1991	(Bangladesh)	Abahani Krira Chakra	1–0	Bikash Panji	Salt Lake Stadium	Kolkata	
100	Asian Cup Winners' Cup	Second Round	01 November 1991	(Japan)	Nissan	1–3	Peter Maguire	Salt Lake Stadium	Kolkata	
101	Asian Cup Winners' Cup	Second Round	08 November 1991	(Japan)	Nissan	0–4	—	Mitsuzawa Football Stadium	Yokohama	
102	Bordoloi Trophy	Semi Final	15 September 1992	(Bangladesh)	Abahani Krira Chakra	1–0	Chibuzor	Nehru Stadium	Guwahati	
103	Tea Planters' Association Trophy	Group Stage	24 September 1992	(Nepal)	Royal Nepal Airlines	1–0	Sudip Chakraborty	Jorhat Stadium	Jorhat	
104	Friendly	—	01 October 1992	(Vietnam)	Vietnam	1–1	Christopher Kem	DSA Stadium	Malda	
105	Friendly	—	02 October 1992	(Vietnam)	Vietnam	1–0	Arindam Deb	DSA Stadium	Malda	
106	DCM Trophy	QF Group Stage	26 December 1992	(Nepal)	Royal Nepal Airlines	3–0	Kuljit Singh (3)	Ambedkar Stadium	Delhi	
107	DCM Trophy	Final	08 January 1993	(South Korea)	Incheon University	1–1 (1–4 p)	Mushtaq Ali	Ambedkar Stadium	Delhi	
108	All Airlines Gold Cup	Group Stage	02 April 1993	(Bangladesh)	Victoria Sporting	6–0	Golam Mustafa (o.g.), Kuljit Singh, Tausif Jamal, Subir Ghosh, Chibuzor, Bhaichung Bhutia	Salt Lake Stadium	Kolkata	
109	Wai Wai Cup	Group Stage	05 June 1993	(Nepal)	Ranipokhari Corner Team	3–0	Sisir Ghosh (2), Kiran Khongsai	Dasarath Stadium	Kathmandu	
110	Wai Wai Cup	Group Stage	07 June 1993	(Nepal)	Nepal Youth XI	1–1	Kiran Khongsai	Dasarath Stadium	Kathmandu	
111	Wai Wai Cup	Group Stage	09 June 1993	(Nepal)	Janakpur Cigarette Factory	2–2	Sanjay Majhi, Sisir Ghosh	Dasarath Stadium	Kathmandu	
112	Wai Wai Cup	Semi Final	12 June 1993	(Malaysia)	Terengganu	1–0	Kiran Khongsai	Dasarath Stadium	Kathmandu	
113	Wai Wai Cup	Final	15 June 1993	(Nepal)	Ranipokhari Corner Team	1–0	Sumon Enjon (o.g.)	Dasarath Stadium	Kathmandu	
114	Asian Cup Winners' Cup	First Round	01 October 1993	(Iraq)	Al-Zawra	6–2	Carlton Chapman (3), Sisir Ghosh, Aqueel Ansari, Kumaresh Bhawal	Salt Lake Stadium	Kolkata	
115	Asian Cup Winners' Cup	First Round	07 October 1993	(Iraq)	Al-Zawra	0–2	—	Kanchenjunga Stadium	Siliguri	
116	Asian Cup Winners' Cup	Second Round	01 November 1993	(Hong Kong)	South China	0–1	—	Salt Lake Stadium	Kolkata	
117	Asian Cup Winners' Cup	Second Round	07 November 1993	(Hong Kong)	South China	1–4	Bhaichung Bhutia	Hong Kong Stadium	Causeway Bay	
118	Bordoloi Trophy	Semi Final	20 November 1993	(Thailand)	Port Authority Bangkok	2–5	Aqueel Ansari, Sisir Ghosh	Nehru Stadium	Guwahati	
119	IFA Shield	Semi Final	08 December 1993	(Kazakhstan)	Irtysh Pavlador	1–1 (3–4 p)	Bhaichung Bhutia	East Bengal Ground	Kolkata	
120	DCM Trophy	QF Group Stage	26 December 1993	(Nepal)	Royal Nepal Airlines	0–2	—	Ambedkar Stadium	Delhi	
121	Charms Cup	QF Group Stage	08 March 1994	(Bangladesh)	Dhaka Mohammedan	0–0	—	East Bengal Ground	Kolkata	
122	All Airlines Gold Cup	Group Stage	03 April 1994	(Thailand)	Port Authority Bangkok	0–0	—	East Bengal Ground	Kolkata	
123	Asian Cup Winners' Cup	First Round	04 August 1994	(Maldives)	Club Lagoons	4–0	Carlton Chapman (2), Sisir Ghosh, Sanjay Majhi	Sugathadasa Stadium	Colombo	
124	Asian Cup Winners' Cup	First Round	06 August 1994	(Sri Lanka)	Renown	1–2	Kiran Khongsai	Sugathadasa Stadium	Colombo	
125	Asian Cup Winners' Cup	Second Round	03 September 1994	(Thailand)	TOT	1–4	Bhaichung Bhutia	TOT Stadium	Bangkok	
126	Asian Cup Winners' Cup	Second Round	16 September 1994	(Thailand)	TOT	w/o	—	Salt Lake Stadium	Kolkata	
127	Scissors Cup	QF Group Stage	13 November 1994	(Thailand)	Krung Thai Bank	1–2	Carlton Chapman	Vyalikaval Ground	Bangalore	
128	DCM Trophy	QF Group Stage	01 January 1995	(Nepal)	SDA	0–1	—	Ambedkar Stadium	Delhi	
129	All Airlines Gold Cup	QF Group Stage	07 April 1995	(Nepal)	SDA	4–0	Kiran Khongsai, Bhaichung Bhutia (2), P. Manoharan	East Bengal Ground	Kolkata	
130	All Airlines Gold Cup	Semi Final	15 April 1995	(Bangladesh)	Abahani Krira Chakra	5–1	Sisir Ghosh (3), P. Manoharan (2)	East Bengal Ground	Kolkata	
131	Asian Cup Winners' Cup	First Round	08 October 1995	(Maldives)	New Radiant	0–3	—	Rasmee Dhandu Stadium	Malé	
132	Asian Cup Winners' Cup	First Round	22 October 1995	(Maldives)	New Radiant	2–0	Biswanath Mondal, Bhaichung Bhutia	Salt Lake Stadium	Kolkata	
133	Scissors Cup	QF Group Stage	10 November 1995	(Oman)	Al-Seeb	0–1	—	Mananchira Maidan	Kozhikode	
134	IFA Shield	QF Group Stage	30 January 1996	(Nepal)	Friends Club	3–0	Mizanur Rahman (3)	Kanchenjunga Stadium	Siliguri	
135	IFA Shield	QF Group Stage	03 February 1996	(Bangladesh)	Dhaka Mohammedan	0–0	—	Kanchenjunga Stadium	Siliguri	
136	IFA Shield	Final	08 February 1996	(Bangladesh)	Dhaka Mohammedan	1–1 (3–1 p)	Ranjan Dey	Salt Lake Stadium	Kolkata	
137	Scissors Cup	QF Group Stage	01 November 1996	(Malaysia)	Negeri Sembilan	1–1	Tausif Jamal	Jawaharlal Nehru Stadium	Chennai	
138	Coca-Cola International Cup	QF Group Stage	22 September 1996	(Nepal)	Sankata Boys	1–2	Sunil Tulhadar (o.g.)	Dasarath Stadium	Kathmandu	
139	Coca-Cola International Cup	QF Group Stage	24 September 1996	(Nepal)	Tribhuvan Club	2–1	Tausif Jamal, Sergei Kutov	Dasarath Stadium	Kathmandu	
140	Coca-Cola International Cup	Semi Final	27 September 1996	(Nepal)	Manang Marshyangdi	0–2	—	Dasarath Stadium	Kathmandu	
141	IFA Shield	Semi Final	Oct 1996	(Iraq)	Al-Karkh	0–4	—	Salt Lake Stadium	Kolkata	
142	Rovers Cup	QF Group Stage	30 November 1996	(Nepal)	Manang Marshyangdi	3–1	Debjit Ghosh, A. Sarvanan, Tausif Jamal	Cooperage Ground	Mumbai	
143	Bangabandhu Cup	QF Group Stage	01 January 1997	(Nepal)	Friends Club	0–1	—	Bangabandhu Stadium	Dhaka	
144	Bangabandhu Cup	QF Group Stage	06 January 1997	(Bangladesh)	Dhaka Mohammedan	1–3	Raman Vijayan	Bangabandhu Stadium	Dhaka	
145	Asian Cup Winners' Cup	First Round	15 August 1997	(Nepal)	Tribhuvan Club	8–0	Bhaichung Bhutia (2), Somatai Shaiza, A. Sarvanan, Naushad Moosa, Garcia, Nazimul Haq, Falguni Dutta	Salt Lake Stadium	Kolkata	
146	Asian Cup Winners' Cup	First Round	15 September 1997	(Nepal)	Tribhuvan Club	3–0	Bhaichung Bhutia, Garcia, Sammy Omollo	Dasarath Stadium	Kathmandu	
147	Asian Cup Winners' Cup	Second Round	15 October 1997	(Japan)	Verdy Kawasaki	2–5	Bhaichung Bhutia (2)	J-Village Stadium	Fukushima	
148	Governor's Gold Cup	Quarter Final	28 October 1997	(Bhutan)	Singye Group	3–0	Debnarayan Chowdhury, Bhaichung Bhutia (2)	Paljor Stadium	Gangtok	
149	Governor's Gold Cup	Final	02 November 1997	(Nepal)	ANFA	1–2	Bhaichung Bhutia	Paljor Stadium	Gangtok	
150	Asian Cup Winners' Cup	Second Round	08 November 1997	(Japan)	Verdy Kawasaki	1–0	Sammy Omollo	Salt Lake Stadium	Kolkata	
151	All Airlines Gold Cup	Group Stage	01 May 1998	(Nepal)	Ranipokhari Corner Team	2–0	Manjit Singh (2)	Sersa Stadium	Midnapore	
152	Asian Club Championship	First Round	19 September 1998	(China)	Dalian Wanda	0–6	—	Jinzhou Stadium	Dalian	
153	Asian Club Championship	First Round	03 October 1998	(China)	Dalian Wanda	0–0	—	Kanchenjunga Stadium	Siliguri	
154	IFA Shield	QF Group Stage	15 November 1998	(Singapore)	Jurong	3–0	Emanuel Opoku (2), Suley Musah	Kanchenjunga Stadium	Siliguri	
155	All Airlines Gold Cup	Final	27 September 1999	(Bangladesh)	Dhaka Mohammedan	1–1 (2–3 p)	Bijen Singh	Durgachak Stadium	Haldia	
156	IFA Shield	QF Group Stage	16 November 1999	(Bangladesh)	Badda Jagarani	1–0	Saroj Das	Salt Lake Stadium	Kolkata	
157	Durand Cup	Group Stage	01 November 2000	(Bangladesh)	Muktijoddha KC	3–1	Dipendu Biswas (3)	Ambedkar Stadium	Delhi	
158	IFA Shield	Final	07 October 2001	(Brazil)	Palmeiras	0–1 (Note: Palmeiras was leading 1–0 at 35 minutes, when a fight broke out between the teams and due to the violent conduct of the visiting team, Palmeiras was scratched off the tournament and East Bengal was announced as the winners.)	—	Salt Lake Stadium	Kolkata	
159	All Airlines Gold Cup	Group Stage	22 November 2001	(Nepal)	ANFA	3–0	Isiyaka, Amit Das, Srikanta Das	Cooch Behar Stadium	Cooch Behar	
160	All Airlines Gold Cup	Final	28 November 2001	(Nepal)	ANFA	2–0	Bijen Singh (2)	Cooch Behar Stadium	Cooch Behar	
161	Friendly	—	10 July 2003	(Indonesia)	India Club	11–0	Bhaichung Bhutia (3), Suley Musah (2), Chandan Das (2), Kalia Kulothungan (2), Mike Okoro, Deepak Mondal	Gelora Bung Karno Stadium	Jakarta	
162	ASEAN Club Championship	Group Stage	14 July 2003	(Thailand)	BEC Tero Sasana	0–1	—	Gelora Bung Karno Stadium	Jakarta	
163	ASEAN Club Championship	Group Stage	16 July 2003	(Philippines)	Philippine Army	6–0	Bhaichung Bhutia (6)	Gelora Bung Karno Stadium	Jakarta	
164	ASEAN Club Championship	Quarter Final	20 July 2003	(Indonesia)	Persita Tangerang	2–1	Bhaichung Bhutia, Bijen Singh	Gelora Bung Karno Stadium	Jakarta	
165	ASEAN Club Championship	Semi Final	24 July 2003	(Indonesia)	Petrokimia Putra	1–1 (7–6 p)	Bhaichung Bhutia	Gelora Bung Karno Stadium	Jakarta	
166	ASEAN Club Championship	Final	26 July 2003	(Thailand)	BEC Tero Sasana	3–1	Mike Okoro, Bhaichung Bhutia, Alvito D'Cunha	Gelora Bung Karno Stadium	Jakarta	
167	AFC Cup	Group Stage	10 February 2004	(Indonesia)	Geylang United	3–2	Cristiano Junior (2), Bijen Singh	Mong Kok Stadium	Kowloon	
168	AFC Cup	Group Stage	25 February 2004	(Malaysia)	Negeri Sembilan	4–2	Mike Okoro, Cristiano Junior (2), Bhaichung Bhutia	Salt Lake Stadium	Kolkata	
169	AFC Cup	Group Stage	07 April 2004	(Maldives)	Island	2–1	Bhaichung Bhutia, Mike Okoro	National Stadium	Malé	
170	AFC Cup	Group Stage	21 April 2004	(Maldives)	Island	3–0	Douglas Silva, Cristiano Junior, Mike Okoro	Salt Lake Stadium	Kolkata	
171	AFC Cup	Group Stage	05 May 2004	(Indonesia)	Geylang United	1–1	Mike Okoro	Salt Lake Stadium	Kolkata	
172	AFC Cup	Group Stage	18 May 2004	(Malaysia)	Negeri Sembilan	1–2	Cristiano Junior	Mong Kok Stadium	Kowloon	
173	Pepsi Max Challenge Cup	Semi Final	31 July 2004	(England)	Leicester City	0–1	—	Walkers Stadium	Leicester	
174	Pepsi Max Challenge Cup	Third-Place Play-off	01 August 2004	(Portugal)	Marítimo	0–3	—	Walkers Stadium	Leicester	
175	AFC Cup	Quarter Final	14 September 2004	(Syria)	Al-Jaish	0–0	—	Salt Lake Stadium	Kolkata	
176	AFC Cup	Quarter Final	21 September 2004	(Syria)	Al-Jaish	0–3	—	King Abdullah Stadium	Amman	
177	IFA Shield	QF Group Stage	01 October 2004	(Bangladesh)	Muktijoddha KC	3–0	Paolo Roberto da Silva (2), Dipankar Roy	Salt Lake Stadium	Kolkata	
178	San Miguel Cup	QF Group Stage	25 December 2004	(Nepal)	Nepal Red	0–1	—	Dasarath Stadium	Kathmandu	
179	San Miguel Cup	QF Group Stage	27 December 2004	(Bangladesh)	Farashganj	2–1	Chandan Das, Alvito D'Cunha	Dasarath Stadium	Kathmandu	
180	San Miguel Cup	Semi Final	31 December 2004	(Nepal)	Nepal Blue	1–0	Paolo Roberto da Silva	Dasarath Stadium	Kathmandu	
181	San Miguel Cup	Final	01 January 2005	(South Korea)	Hannam University	0–0 (4–2 p)	—	Dasarath Stadium	Kathmandu	
182	AFC Cup	Group Stage	09 March 2005	(Bangladesh)	Muktijoddha KC	0–0	—	Salt Lake Stadium	Kolkata	
183	AFC Cup	Group Stage	16 March 2005	(Turkmenistan)	Nebitçi Balkanabat	2–3	Marcos Secco, Bhaichung Bhutia	Balkanabat Stadium	Balkanabat	
184	AFC Cup	Group Stage	06 April 2005	(Jordan)	Al-Faisaly	0–5	—	Amman International Stadium	Amman	
185	AFC Cup	Group Stage	20 April 2005	(Jordan)	Al-Faisaly	0–1	—	Salt Lake Stadium	Kolkata	
186	AFC Cup	Group Stage	11 May 2005	(Bangladesh)	Muktijoddha KC	1–0	Bijen Singh	Bangabandhu Stadium	Dhaka	
187	AFC Cup	Group Stage	25 May 2005	(Turkmenistan)	Nebitçi Balkanabat	3–2	Ernest Jeremiah (3)	Salt Lake Stadium	Kolkata	
188	Friendly	—	27 January 2006	(Brazil)	São Paulo	0–3	—	Kanchenjunga Stadium	Siliguri	
189	IFA Shield	QF Group Stage	03 March 2008	(South Africa)	Santos	1–1	Edmilson Marques Pardal	Sailen Manna Stadium	Howrah	
190	AFC Cup	Group Stage	11 March 2008	(Lebanon)	Safa	0–1	—	Sports City Stadium	Beirut	
191	AFC Cup	Group Stage	18 March 2008	(Yemen)	Al-Ahli Sana'a	1–0	Edmilson Marques Pardal	Salt Lake Stadium	Kolkata	
192	AFC Cup	Group Stage	03 April 2008	(Jordan)	Al-Wahdat	2–0	Alvito D'Cunha, Ikechukwu Gift Ibe	Prince Mohammad Stadium	Zarqa	
193	AFC Cup	Group Stage	16 April 2008	(Jordan)	Al-Wahdat	2–4	Syed Rahim Nabi, Edmilson Marques Pardal	Salt Lake Stadium	Kolkata	
194	AFC Cup	Group Stage	30 April 2008	(Lebanon)	Safa	0–0	—	Salt Lake Stadium	Kolkata	
195	AFC Cup	Group Stage	14 May 2008	(Yemen)	Al-Ahli Sana'a	0–1	—	Ali Mohsen Al-Muraisi Stadium	Sana'a	
196	Friendly	—	17 January 2009	(Germany)	FC Bayern Munich II	0–1	—	Barasat Stadium	Kolkata	
197	Friendly	—	19 January 2009	(Germany)	FC Bayern Munich II	1–5	Sunil Chhetri	East Bengal Ground	Kolkata	
198	Friendly	—	16 August 2009	(Myanmar)	Yadanarbon	1–2	Harmanjot Khabra	Bahtoo Stadium	Mandalay	
199	Friendly	—	19 August 2009	(Myanmar)	Yangon United	3–1	Harmanjot Khabra, Edmilson Marques Pardal (2)	Aung San Stadium	Yangon	
200	Friendly	—	21 August 2009	(Myanmar)	Okktha United	1–0	Omar Sebastián Monesterolo	Aung San Stadium	Yangon	
201	Friendly	—	23 August 2009	(Myanmar)	Magwe	2–2	Omar Sebastián Monesterolo, Beikhokhei Beingaichho	Thuwunna Stadium	Yangon	
202	AFC Cup	Group Stage	10 March 2010	(Syria)	Al-Ittihad	1–4	Yusif Yakubu	Salt Lake Stadium	Kolkata	
203	AFC Cup	Group Stage	17 March 2010	(Lebanon)	Nejmeh	0–3	—	Camille Chamoun Stadium	Beirut	
204	AFC Cup	Group Stage	24 March 2010	(Kuwait)	Qadsia	2–3	Subhash Singh, Yusif Yakubu	Salt Lake Stadium	Kolkata	
205	AFC Cup	Group Stage	06 April 2010	(Kuwait)	Qadsia	1–4	Mehtab Hossain	Al-Hamad Stadium	Hawally	
206	AFC Cup	Group Stage	20 April 2010	(Syria)	Al-Ittihad	1–2	Beikhokhei Beingaichho	Aleppo International Stadium	Aleppo	
207	AFC Cup	Group Stage	27 April 2010	(Lebanon)	Nejmeh	0–4	—	Salt Lake Stadium	Kolkata	
208	AFC Cup	Group Stage	02 March 2011	(Thailand)	Chonburi	4–4	Tolgay Ozbey (2), Baljit Sahni, Ravinder Singh	Salt Lake Stadium	Kolkata	
209	AFC Cup	Group Stage	16 March 2011	(Indonesia)	Persipura Jayapura	1–4	Tolgay Ozbey	Gelora Bung Karno Stadium	Jakarta	
210	IFA Shield	QF Group Stage	25 March 2011	(China)	Shandong Luneng	3–1	Baljit Sahni, Ravinder Singh, Reisangmei Vashum	Salt Lake Stadium	Kolkata	
211	AFC Cup	Group Stage	13 April 2011	(Hong Kong)	South China	0–1	—	Hong Kong Stadium	Causeway Bay	
212	AFC Cup	Group Stage	26 April 2011	(Hong Kong)	South China	3–3	Tolgay Ozbey (2), Baljit Sahni	Barabati Stadium	Cuttack	
213	AFC Cup	Group Stage	03 May 2011	(Thailand)	Chonburi	0–4	—	IPE Chonburi Stadium	Chonburi	
214	AFC Cup	Group Stage	10 May 2011	(Indonesia)	Persipura Jayapura	1–1	Baljit Sahni	Salt Lake Stadium	Kolkata	
215	BTV Becamex IDC Cup	Group Stage	07 October 2011	(Vietnam)	SHB Da Nang	2–2	Khanthang Paite, Reisangmei Vashum	Gò Đậu Stadium	Thu Dau Mot	
216	BTV Becamex IDC Cup	Group Stage	09 October 2011	(Vietnam)	Sai Gon Xuan Thanh	0–1	—	Gò Đậu Stadium	Thu Dau Mot	
217	BTV Becamex IDC Cup	Group Stage	11 October 2011	(Brazil)	Matsubara	0–1	—	Gò Đậu Stadium	Thu Dau Mot	
218	AFC Cup	Group Stage	06 March 2012	(Yemen)	Al-Oruba	0–1	—	Salt Lake Stadium	Kolkata	
219	AFC Cup	Group Stage	20 March 2012	(Kuwait)	Kazma	0–3	—	Al-Sadaqua Stadium	Kuwait City	
220	AFC Cup	Group Stage	04 April 2012	(Iraq)	Arbil	0–2	—	Salt Lake Stadium	Kolkata	
221	AFC Cup	Group Stage	10 April 2012	(Iraq)	Arbil	0–2	—	Franso Hariri Stadium	Erbil	
222	AFC Cup	Group Stage	25 April 2012	(Yemen)	Al-Oruba	1–4	Edmilson Marques Pardal	Prince Mohammed Stadium	Zarqa	
223	AFC Cup	Group Stage	09 May 2012	(Kuwait)	Kazma	1–2	Edmilson Marques Pardal	Salt Lake Stadium	Kolkata	
224	AFC Cup	Group Stage	27 February 2013	(Malaysia)	Selangor	1–0	Lalrindika Ralte	Salt Lake Stadium	Kolkata	
225	AFC Cup	Group Stage	13 March 2013	(Vietnam)	Sai Gon Xuan Thanh	0–0	—	Thống Nhất Stadium	Ho Chi Minh City	
226	AFC Cup	Group Stage	03 April 2013	(Singapore)	Tampines Roverss	4–2	Anaz Hadee (o.g.), Andrew Barisic (2), Chidi Edeh	Jalan Besar Stadium	Jalan Besar	
227	AFC Cup	Group Stage	09 April 2013	(Singapore)	Tampines Rovers	2–1	Chidi Edeh, Lalrindika Ralte	Salt Lake Stadium	Kolkata	
228	AFC Cup	Group Stage	23 April 2013	(Malaysia)	Selangor	2–2	Penn Orji, Lalrindika Ralte	Shah Alam Stadium	Shah Alam	
229	AFC Cup	Group Stage	30 April 2013	(Vietnam)	Sai Gon Xuan Thanh	4–1	Chidi Edeh, Andrew Barisic, Penn Orji (2)	Salt Lake Stadium	Kolkata	
230	AFC Cup	Round of 16	15 May 2013	(Myanmar)	Yangon United	5–1	Penn Orji, Chidi Edeh (3), Mehtab Hossain	Salt Lake Stadium	Kolkata	
231	AFC Cup	Quarter Final	17 September 2013	(Indonesia)	Semen Padang	1–0	Ryuji Sueoka	Salt Lake Stadium	Kolkata	
232	AFC Cup	Quarter Final	24 September 2013	(Indonesia)	Semen Padang	1–1	James Moga	Haji Agus Salim Stadium	Padang	
233	AFC Cup	Semi Final	01 October 2013	(Kuwait)	Al-Kuwait	2–4	Uga Okpara, Lalrindika Ralte	Al Kuwait Stadium	Kuwait City	
234	AFC Cup	Semi Final	22 October 2013	(Kuwait)	Al-Kuwait	0–3	—	Salt Lake Stadium	Kolkata	
235	IFA Shield	Group Stage	29 January 2014	(South Korea)	Busan Kyotong	1–1	James Moga	Barasat Stadium	Kolkata	
236	IFA Shield	Group Stage	01 February 2014	(Indonesia)	Geylang United	2–0	Seminlen Doungel, Chidi Edeh	Salt Lake Stadium	Kolkata	
237	IFA Shield	Semi Final	11 February 2014	(Bangladesh)	Sheikh Jamal Dhanmondi	0–3	—	Salt Lake Stadium	Kolkata	
238	AFC Cup	Group Stage	24 February 2015	(Malaysia)	Johor Darul Ta'zim	1–4	Ranti Martins	Larkin Stadium	Johor Bahru	
239	AFC Cup	Group Stage	10 March 2015	(Hong Kong)	Kitchee	1–1	Ranti Martins	Salt Lake Stadium	Kolkata	
240	AFC Cup	Group Stage	17 March 2015	(Singapore)	Balestier Khalsa	1–2	Dudu Omagbemi	Jalan Besar Stadium	Jalan Besar	
241	AFC Cup	Group Stage	14 April 2015	(Singapore)	Balestier Khalsa	3–0	Baldeep Singh, Nurullah Hussein (o.g.), Ranti Martins	Salt Lake Stadium	Kolkata	
242	AFC Cup	Group Stage	28 April 2015	(Malaysia)	Johor Darul Ta'zim	0–1	—	Salt Lake Stadium	Kolkata	
243	AFC Cup	Group Stage	12 May 2015	(Hong Kong)	Kitchee	2–2	Ranti Martins, Cavin Lobo	Mong Kok Stadium	Kowloon	
244	Sheikh Kamal Cup	Group Stage	20 October 2015	(Bangladesh)	Chittagong Abahani	2–1	Mohammed Rafique, Prohlad Roy	M. A. Aziz Stadium	Chittagong	
245	Sheikh Kamal Cup	Group Stage	22 October 2015	(Pakistan)	K-Electric	3–1	Orok Essien, Mohammed Rafique, Ranti Martins	M. A. Aziz Stadium	Chittagong	
246	Sheikh Kamal Cup	Group Stage	24 October 2015	(Bangladesh)	Abahani Krira Chakra	0–0	—	M. A. Aziz Stadium	Chittagong	
247	Sheikh Kamal Cup	Semi Final	28 October 2015	(Bangladesh)	Dhaka Mohammedan	3–0	Ranti Martins (2), Mohammed Rafique	M. A. Aziz Stadium	Chittagong	
248	Sheikh Kamal Cup	Final	30 October 2015	(Bangladesh)	Chittagong Abahani	1–3	Rezaul Karim (o.g.)	M. A. Aziz Stadium	Chittagong	
249	Bordoloi Trophy	QF Group Stage	22 September 2016	(Bangladesh)	Bongobi Agragami	6–0	Somide Adelaja, Do Dong-hyun (2), Jiten Murmu, Prohlad Roy, Nikhil Poojari	Nehru Stadium	Guwahati	
250	Bordoloi Trophy	Final	30 September 2016	(Nepal)	Three Star Club	1–2	Somide Adelaja	Nehru Stadium	Guwahati	
251	Friendly	—	07 October 2018	(Malaysia)	UiTM	4–1	Yami Longvah, Enrique Esqueda, Mahmoud Amnah, Jobby Justin	UiTM Stadium	Shah Alam	
252	Friendly	—	13 October 2018	(Malaysia)	Terengganu	0–0	—	USIM Mini Stadium	Nilai	
253	Friendly	—	17 October 2018	(Malaysia)	PDRM	6–2	Surabuddin Mollick, Enrique Esqueda, Brandon Vanlalremdika, Bidyashagar Singh, Jobby Justin (2)	MSN Ground	Kuala Lumpur	
254	Friendly	—	19 October 2018	(Malaysia)	UiTM Reserves	1–0	Enrique Esqueda	Sime Darby Field	Kuala Lumpur	
255	Durand Cup	Group Stage	6 August 2023	(Bangladesh)	Bangladesh Army	2–2	Saúl Crespo, Javier Siverio	Salt Lake Stadium	Kolkata	
256	AFC Champions League Two	Preliminary Stage	14 August 2024	(Turkmenistan)	Altyn Asyr	2–3	David Lalhlansanga, Saúl Crespo	Salt Lake Stadium	Kolkata	
257	AFC Challenge League	Group stage	26 October 2024	(Bhutan)	Paro	2–2	Madih Talal, Dimitrios Diamantakos	Changlimithang Stadium	Thimphu	
258	AFC Challenge League	Group stage	29 October 2024	(Bangladesh)	Bashundhara Kings	4–0	Dimitrios Diamantakos, Souvik Chakrabarti, Nandhakumar Sekar, Anwar Ali	Changlimithang Stadium	Thimphu	
259	AFC Challenge League	Group stage	1 November 2024	(Lebanon)	Nejmeh	3–2	Baba Abdulai Musah (o.g.), Dimitrios Diamantakos (2)	Changlimithang Stadium	Thimphu	
260	AFC Challenge League	Quarter Final	5 March 2025	(Turkmenistan)	Arkadag	0–1	–	Salt Lake Stadium	Kolkata	
261	AFC Challenge League	Quarter Final	12 March 2025	(Turkmenistan)	Arkadag	1–2	Raphaël Messi Bouli	Arkadag Stadium	Arkadag	
262	AFC Champions League Two	Preliminary Stage	12 August 2026	(Kuwait)	Al-Arabi	4–1	Jay Gupta, Mohammed Rashid, David Lalhlansanga, Rohit Danu	Salt Lake Stadium	Kolkata	
263	AFC Champions League Two	Group Stage	16 September 2026	(Jordan)	Al-Hussein	2–2	Dani Ramírez, Anwar Ali	Amman International Stadium	Amman	
264	AFC Champions League Two	Group Stage	13 October 2026	(Iraq)	Al-Shorta	2–3	David Lalhlansanga (2)	Salt Lake Stadium	Kolkata	
265	AFC Champions League Two	Group Stage	27 October 2026	(Oman)	Al-Seeb	0–0	—N/a	Al-Seeb Stadium	Seeb	
266	AFC Champions League Two	Group Stage	3 November 2026	(Oman)	Al-Seeb	0–2	—N/a	Salt Lake Stadium	Kolkata	
267	AFC Champions League Two	Group Stage	24 November 2026	(Jordan)	Al-Hussein	–		Salt Lake Stadium	Kolkata	
268	AFC Champions League Two	Group Stage	8 December 2026	(Iraq)	Al-Shorta	–		Al-Zawraa Stadium	Baghdad	

== Overall record as per tournament ==
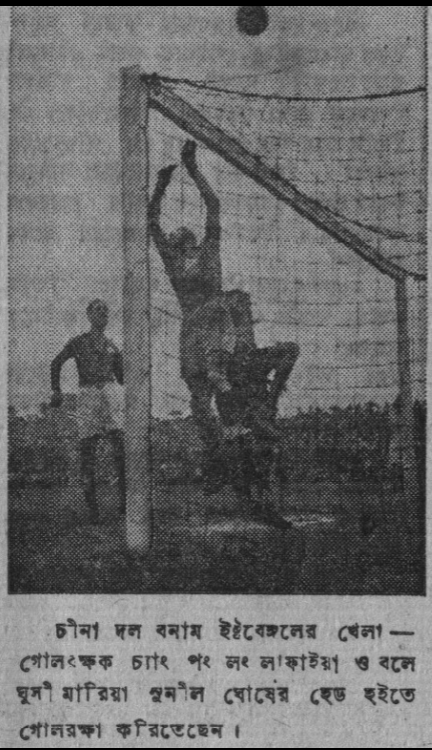
14 July 1948 - East Bengal vs China Olympic Team in action - photo from Jugantor newspaper 15 July 1948.

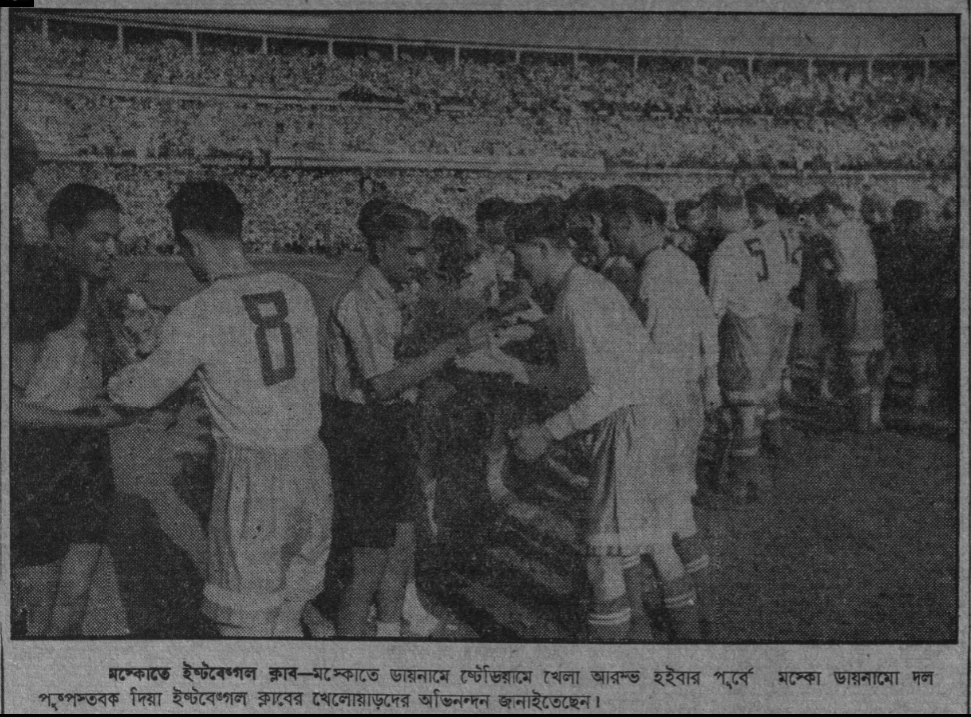
21 August 1953 - East Bengal vs Torpedo Moscow, Central Dynamo Stadium, Moscow - photo from Jugantor newspaper 22 September 1953.

As of 3 November 2026

East Bengal Club overall record against foreign opponents
Tournament	P	W	D	L	GF	GA	GD	Win %
Asian Club Championship (Note: Includes record for the Coca-Cola Cup 1985, which was organized as a preliminary qualification tournament for the 1985-86 Asian Club Championship.)	9	5	1	3	21	10	+11	55.56
Asian Cup Winners' Cup	18	7	1	10	31	33	−2	38.89
AFC Cup/AFC Champions League Two	61	16	14	31	81	115	−34	26.23
AFC Challenge League	5	2	1	2	10	7	+3	40.00
AFC Tournaments Total	93	30	17	46	143	165	−22	32.26
All Airlines Gold Cup	8	6	1	1	23	2	+21	75.00
ASEAN Club Championship	5	4	0	1	12	4	+8	80.00
Bangabandhu Cup	2	0	0	2	1	4	−3	0.00
Bordoloi Trophy	7	4	1	2	19	10	+9	57.14
BTC Club Cup	3	1	1	1	3	3	+0	33.33
BTV Becamex IDC Cup	3	0	1	2	2	4	−2	0.00
Charms Cup	1	0	1	0	0	0	+0	0.00
Coca-Cola Cup	3	1	0	2	3	5	−2	33.33
Darjeeling Gold Cup	1	0	0	1	0	1	−1	0.00
DCM Trophy	26	8	4	14	24	37	−13	30.77
Durand Cup	3	1	2	0	5	3	+2	33.33
Governor's Gold Cup	3	2	0	1	5	2	+3	66.67
IFA Shield	26	17	4	5	42	18	+24	65.38
JC Guha Trophy	2	1	0	1	5	1	+4	50.00
Mohun Bagan Centenary Cup	2	0	1	1	1	2	−1	0.00
Nehru Centenary Club Cup	2	0	0	2	0	2	−2	0.00
P. K. Nair Gold Cup	1	1	0	0	1	0	+1	100.00
Pepsi Max Challenge Cup	2	0	0	2	0	4	−4	0.00
Rovers Cup	2	2	0	0	4	1	+3	100.00
San Miguel Cup	4	3	0	1	3	2	+1	75.00
Scissors Cup	3	0	1	2	2	4	−2	0.00
Sheikh Kamal Cup	5	3	1	1	9	5	+4	60.00
Stafford Cup	1	1	0	0	1	0	+1	100.00
Tea Planters' Association Trophy	1	1	0	0	1	0	+1	100.00
Wai Wai Cup	5	3	2	0	8	3	+5	60.00
World Youth Festival	4	2	0	2	10	10	+0	50.00
Total in competitive matches	218	91	37	90	327	292	+35	41.74
Friendlies	48	17	9	22	66	105	−39	35.42
Total	266	108	46	112	393	397	−4	40.60

Last updated: 12 March 2025
Source: East Bengal against Foreign Opponents

== Overall record as per nationalities ==
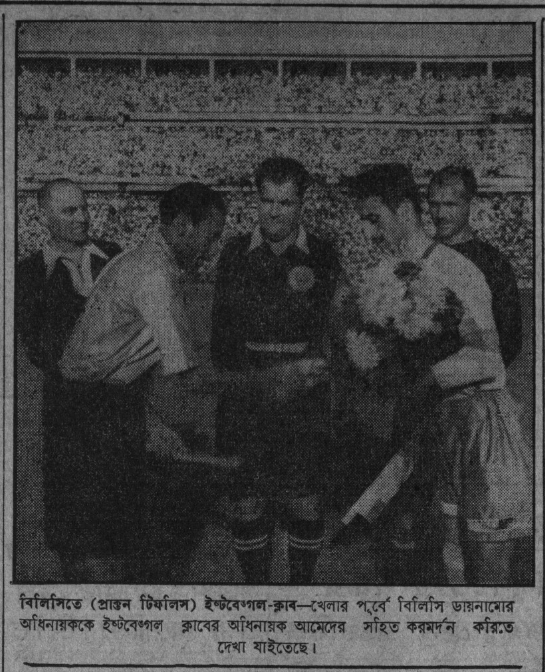
25 August 1953 – Ahmed Khan, captain of East Bengal and Avtandil Gogoberidze, the captain of Dynamo Tbilisi before the match.

As of 3 November 2026

East Bengal Club overall record against clubs from different nationalities
Nationality	P	W	D	L	GF	GA	GD	Win %
(Armenian Soviet Socialist Republic) Armenian SSR	1	0	0	1	0	1	−1	0.00
Australia	3	1	0	2	1	5	−4	33.33
Austria	1	1	0	0	2	0	+2	100.00
Bahrain	1	1	0	0	1	0	+1	100.00
Bangladesh (Note: Includes records for matches against teams from East Pakistan.)	47	27	11	9	81	33	+48	57.45
Bhutan	3	2	1	0	6	2	+4	66.67
Brazil	3	1	0	2	0	5	−5	33.33
Cameroon	2	0	1	1	1	2	−1	0.00
China	5	2	1	2	5	10	−5	40.00
Denmark	1	0	0	1	0	1	−1	0.00
England	2	0	1	1	1	2	−1	0.00
Germany (Note: Includes records for matches against teams from West Germany.)	4	0	0	4	3	12	−9	0.00
Hong Kong	7	0	3	4	8	18	−10	0.00
Hungary	1	0	0	1	1	5	−4	0.00
Indonesia	11	6	3	2	24	13	+11	54.55
Iran	2	1	0	1	1	1	+0	50.00
Iraq	7	2	0	5	9	15	−6	28.57
Japan	4	1	0	3	4	12	−8	25.00
Jordan	5	1	1	3	6	12	−6	20.00
Kazakhstan	1	0	0	1	1	1	+0	0.00
Kuwait	7	1	0	6	10	20	−10	14.29
Lebanon	6	2	1	3	9	11	−2	33.33
Malaysia	15	8	4	3	28	16	+12	53.33
Maldives	6	5	0	1	20	4	+16	83.33
Myanmar	13	5	2	6	20	29	−9	38.46
Nepal	28	17	2	9	58	19	+39	60.71
Nigeria	1	1	0	0	3	1	+2	100.00
North Korea	3	2	1	0	3	1	+2	66.67
Oman	3	0	1	2	0	3	−3	0.00
Pakistan	3	3	0	0	6	1	+5	100.00
Paraguay	1	0	0	1	0	1	−1	0.00
Philippines	1	1	0	0	6	0	+6	100.00
Portugal	1	0	0	1	0	3	−3	0.00
Romania	1	0	0	1	0	4	−4	0.00
Saudi Arabia	1	0	0	1	1	2	−1	0.00
Singapore	5	4	0	1	13	5	+8	80.00
South Africa	1	0	1	0	1	1	+0	0.00
South Korea	13	3	3	7	9	20	−11	23.08
Soviet Union	5	0	1	4	5	34	−29	0.00
Sri Lanka	2	1	0	1	2	2	+0	50.00
Sweden	2	1	0	1	1	2	−1	50.00
Syria	4	0	1	3	2	9	−7	0.00
Thailand	13	5	2	6	22	29	−7	38.46
Turkmenistan	5	1	0	4	8	11	−3	20.00
(Ukrainian Soviet Socialist Republic) Ukrainian SSR	1	0	0	1	0	4	−4	0.00
Uruguay	2	0	1	1	1	1	+0	0.00
(Soviet Union) USSR	1	0	0	1	0	2	−2	0.00
(Uzbek Soviet Socialist Republic) Uzbek SSR	1	0	0	1	0	1	−1	0.00
Vietnam	6	2	3	1	8	5	+3	33.33
Yemen	4	1	0	3	2	6	−4	25.00
Total	266	108	46	112	393	396	−3	40.60

Last updated: 3 November 2026
Source: East Bengal against Foreign Opponents

== Records of Women's team ==
Keys
The symbols and colours used below:
- Win
- Draw
- Loss
- Finals with this background and symbol in the "Round" column are the finals won by East Bengal in a tournament.
- P = matches played; W = matches won; D = matches drawn; L = matches lost; Win% = percentage of total matches won.

=== Match list ===
List of all matches against foreign opponents for East Bengal Women
Sl no.	Competition	Round	Date	Nat.	Opposition	Score	Scorers for EB	Venue	City	Refs
1	AFC Women's Champions League	Prelims	25 August 2025	(Cambodia)	Phnom Penh Crown	1–0	Fazila Ikwaput	MTN Sports Complex	Phnom Penh	
2	AFC Women's Champions League	Prelims	31 August 2025	(Hong Kong)	Kitchee	1–1	Sangita Basfore	MTN Sports Complex	Phnom Penh	
3	AFC Women's Champions League	Group Stage	17 November 2025	(Iran)	Bam Khatoon	3–1	Ikwaput, Nanziri, Shilky	Hankou CSC	Wuhan	
4	AFC Women's Champions League	Group Stage	20 November 2025	(China)	Wuhan Jiangda	0–2	–	Hankou CSC	Wuhan	
5	AFC Women's Champions League	Group Stage	23 November 2025	(Uzbekistan)	Nasaf	0–3	–	Hankou CSC	Wuhan	
6	SAFF Club Women's Championship	Group Stage	8 December 2025	(Bhutan)	Transport United	4–0	Fazila (2), Raul, Nanziri	Dasarath Rangasala Stadium	Kathmandu	
7	SAFF Club Women's Championship	Group Stage	11 December 2025	(Pakistan)	Karachi City	2–0	Raul, Nanziri	Dasarath Rangasala Stadium	Kathmandu	
8	SAFF Club Women's Championship	Group Stage	14 December 2025	(Bangladesh)	Nasrin SC	7–0	Fazila (4), Raul, Jyoti	Dasarath Rangasala Stadium	Kathmandu	
9	SAFF Club Women's Championship	Group Stage	17 December 2025	(Nepal)	APF	0–0	–	Dasarath Rangasala Stadium	Kathmandu	
10	SAFF Club Women's Championship	Final	20 December 2025	(Nepal)	APF	3–0	Ikwaput (2), Shilky	Dasarath Rangasala Stadium	Kathmandu	
11	AFC Women's Champions League	Prelims	17 August 2026	(Bangladesh)	Rajshahi Stars	4–0	Soumya, Olivia (2), Astam	Likas Stadium	Sabah	
12	AFC Women's Champions League	Prelims	20 August 2026	(Guam)	Rovers	12–0	Priyangka (2), Astam, Olivia (2), Antwi, Raul, Shilky, Opoku (2), Anju, Soumya	Likas Stadium	Sabah	
13	AFC Women's Champions League	Prelims	23 August 2026	(Malaysia)	Sabah	2–0	Soumya, Olivia	Likas Stadium	Sabah	
14	AFC Women's Champions League	Group Stage	1 November 2026	(Vietnam)	Hồ Chí Minh City	2–1	Fazila (2)	Kishore Bharati Krirangan	Kolkata	
15	AFC Women's Champions League	Group Stage	4 November 2026	(South Korea)	Hwacheon KSPO	1–4	Fazila	Kishore Bharati Krirangan	Kolkata	
16	AFC Women's Champions League	Group Stage	7 November 2026	(North Korea)	4.25	–		Kishore Bharati Krirangan	Kolkata	

=== Statistics ===
==== Overall record by Nationality ====
As of 1 November 2026

East Bengal Women's Team's overall record against clubs from different nationalities
Nationality	P	W	D	L	GF	GA	GD	Win %
Bangladesh	2	2	0	0	11	0	+11	100.00
Bhutan	1	1	0	0	4	0	+4	100.00
Cambodia	1	1	0	0	1	0	+1	100.00
China PR	1	0	0	1	0	2	−2	0.00
Guam	1	1	0	0	12	0	+12	100.00
Hong Kong	1	0	1	0	1	1	+0	0.00
Iran	1	1	0	0	3	1	+2	100.00
Malaysia	1	1	0	0	2	0	+2	100.00
Nepal	2	1	1	0	3	0	+3	50.00
North Korea	0	0	0	0	0	0	+0	—
Pakistan	1	1	0	0	2	0	+2	100.00
South Korea	0	0	0	0	0	0	+0	—
Uzbekistan	1	0	0	1	0	3	−3	0.00
Vietnam	1	1	0	0	2	1	+1	100.00
Total	14	10	2	2	41	8	+33	71.43

==== Overall record by Tournament ====
As of 1 November 2026

East Bengal Women's Team's overall record against foreign opponents
Tournament	P	W	D	L	GF	GA	GD	Win %
AFC Women's Champions League (Note: Includes record for the preliminary qualification matches as well.)	9	6	1	2	25	8	+17	66.67
SAFF Women's Club Championship	5	4	1	0	16	0	+16	80.00
Total	14	10	2	2	41	8	+33	71.43

== See also ==
- East Bengal Club in international football
- Mohun Bagan in international football

== Bibliography ==
Books

- Goswami, Ramesh Chandra (1963). East Bengal Cluber Itihas (in Bengali). Kolkata: Book Garden.
- Bandyopadhyay, Santipriya (1979). Cluber Naam East Bengal (in Bengali). Kolkata: New Bengal Press.
- Chattopadhyay, Hariprasad (2017). Mohun Bagan-East Bengal (in Bengali). Kolkata: Parul Prakashan.
- Saha, Rupak (2000). Itihase East Bengal (in Bengali). Kolkata: Deep.
- Saha, Rupak (2020). East Bengal – Prothom Eksho Bochor (in Bengali). Kolkata: The Cafe Table. ISBN 978-93-89873-21-4.
- Roy, Gautam (2021). East Bengal 100. Kolkata: All Sport Foundation. ISBN 978-81-947631-0-9.
- Saha, Rupak (2022). Itihase East Bengal – Spordhar Eksho Bochor (in Bengali). Kolkata: Deep. ISBN 978-93-94432-17-8.
