= 1951 Durand Cup final =

- Event: 1951 Durand Cup
East Bengal	Rajasthan Armed Constabulary
- East Bengal won after a replay

Final
East Bengal	Rajasthan Armed Constabulary
1	1
- Date: 21 October 1951
- Venue: Delhi Gate Stadium, New Delhi, India
- Referee: Major F. Upfold
- Attendance: 10,000 (estd.)

Replay
East Bengal	Rajasthan Armed Constabulary
2	1
- Date: 22 October 1951
- Venue: Delhi Gate Stadium, New Delhi, India
- Referee: Major F. Upfold
- Attendance: 8,000 (estd.)

The 1951 Durand Cup final was the 48th final of the Durand Cup, the oldest football competition in India, and was contested between Kolkata giant East Bengal and Rajasthan Armed Constabulary on 21 October 1951 first which ended in a draw and then a replay on 22 October 1951 at the Delhi Gate Stadium in New Delhi.

East Bengal won the replay final 2–1 to claim their 1st Durand Cup title. Ahmed Khan and Pansanttom Venkatesh scored the goals for East Bengal in the replay final as East Bengal lifted their first Durand Cup title.

== Route to the final ==
East Bengal		Round	Rajasthan Armed Constabulary	
Opponent	Result	Round	Opponent	Result
Kalighat	4–1	Quarter–Final	Indian Air Force	1–0
Hyderabad Police	1–0	Semi–Final	Young Mens	2–0

== Match ==
=== Summary ===
The Durand Cup final began at the Delhi Gate Stadium in New Delhi on 21 October 1951 in front of a packed crowd as Kolkata giant East Bengal and faced Rajasthan Armed Constabulary. East Bengal reached their maiden Durand Cup final after defeating Hyderabad Police 1–0 in the semi-final. Rajasthan Armed Constabulary also made their maiden appearance in the final after they defeated Young Mens 2–0 in the semi-final.

East Bengal started as the favorites having already won the IFA Shield, and with a star-studded forward line consisting of the famous Pancha Pandavas. East Bengal got the best chance in the first half as Pansanttom Venkatesh shot hit the crossbar in the twenty-first minute. The deadlock was broken in the second half as Venkatesh found the net with a grounded effort in the thirty-fifth minute to give East Bengal the lead. Rajasthan however, was quick to respond and equalised just five minutes later as their star forward Sheoo Mewalal found the back of the net with a header to make it 1–1. The game ended in a draw and the organising committee decided to host the replay final the very next day.

=== Details ===
21 October 1951
16:00 IST

East Bengal	1–1	Rajasthan Armed Constabulary
Venkatesh 35'		Mewalal 40'

Delhi Gate Stadium, New Delhi
Attendance: 10,000 (est.)
Referee: Major F. Upfold

East Bengal	Rajasthan Armed Constabulary

GK	(India) Manilal Ghatak
FB	(India) Byomkesh Bose (c)
FB	(India) Ansari
HB	(India) G. R. Gokul
HB	(India) Chandan Singh
HB	(India) S. Ray
FW	(India) Pansanttom Venkatesh
FW	(India) Sushil Bhattacharya
FW	(India) K. P. Dhanraj
FW	(India) Ahmed Khan
FW	(India) P. B. A. Saleh

GK	(India) Sanjeeva Uchil
FB	(India) Manuel
FB	(India) Ratnam (c)
HB	(India) Arokiyaswami
HB	(India) Gurbaux Singh
HB	(India) Mahabir Prasad
FW	(India) Kanaiyan
FW	(India) Myasi
FW	(India) Sheoo Mewalal
FW	(India) Raman
FW	(India) Kupuswami

Match rules

- 50 minutes.
- Replay if scores still level.
- No Substitutes.

== Replay ==
=== Summary ===
The replay final began at the Rajasthan Armed Constabulary in New Delhi on 22 October 1951 after the first game ended in a 1–1 stalemate.

East Bengal made a fast start and was once again the first to score as Ahmed Khan found the net with a powerful shot in the fourteenth minute after receiving a pass from K. P. Dhanraj. Rajasthan was quick to respond and equalized just three minutes later as Raman made a solo run past four defenders to place the ball inside the goal to make it 1–1. East Bengal found the winner in the second half with just eight minutes remaining when Pansanttom Venkatesh dribbled past a couple of defenders to score with a powerful left-footed strike to make it 2–1 as East Bengal lifted their maiden Durand Cup title, thus also becoming the first ever Indian team to win the IFA Shield and Durand Cup in the same season, a record previously only held by British regimental teams: Black Watch (1920), Worcestershire Regiment (1921), and Sherwood Foresters (1928).

=== Details ===
22 October 1951
16:00 IST

East Bengal	2–1	Rajasthan Armed Constabulary
Khan 14'; Venkatesh 42'		Raman 17'

Delhi Gate Stadium, New Delhi
Attendance: 10,000 (est.)
Referee: Major F. Upfold

East Bengal	Rajasthan Armed Constabulary

GK	(India) Manilal Ghatak
FB	(India) Byomkesh Bose (c)
FB	(India) Ansari
HB	(India) G. R. Gokul
HB	(India) Chandan Singh
HB	(India) S. Ray
FW	(India) Pansanttom Venkatesh
FW	(India) Sushil Bhattacharya
FW	(India) K. P. Dhanraj
FW	(India) Ahmed Khan
FW	(India) P. B. A. Saleh

GK	(India) Sanjeeva Uchil
FB	(India) Manuel
FB	(India) Ratnam (c)
HB	(India) Arokiyaswami
HB	(India) Gurbaux Singh
HB	(India) Mahabir Prasad
FW	(India) Kanaiyan
FW	(India) Myasi
FW	(India) Sheoo Mewalal
FW	(India) Raman
FW	(India) Kupuswami

Match rules

- 50 minutes.
- Joint winners if both finals ends in a draw.
- No Substitutes.
