= List of East Bengal FC captains =

East Bengal FC is an Indian association football club based in Kolkata, West Bengal, which competes in the top tier of Indian football. The club was formed in August 1920 when the Jorabagan Club's vice-president, Suresh Chandra Chaudhuri, resigned. He did so after the club sent out their starting eleven with the notable exclusion of defender Sailesh Bose, who was dropped from the squad for undisclosed reasons when they were about to face Mohun Bagan in the Coochbehar Cup semi-final on 28 July 1920. He, along with Raja Manmatha Nath Chaudhuri, Ramesh Chandra Sen and Aurobinda Ghosh, formed East Bengal on 1 August 1920. East Bengal started playing in the Calcutta Football League, 2nd division, in 1921. In 1925, they qualified for the first division for the first time and since then they have won many Indian football titles.

East Bengal joined the National Football League (NFL) at its inception in 1996 and is the only club to have played every season to date, including those after the rebranded I-League succeeded the NFL in 2007. East Bengal won the National Football League in 2000–01, 2002–03 and 2003–04 and were runners up seven times, the most by any Indian football club. Among other trophies, East Bengal has won the Calcutta Football League 39 times, the IFA Shield 28 times, the Federation Cup eight times and the Durand Cup 16 times.

There have been ninety-six different captains officially announced by the club. This chronological list comprises the East Bengal captains since their foundation in 1920. Every captain's entry includes the season in which the player was officially declared as the captain of the team by the club and his nationality.

== List of East Bengal captains ==
The list of captains for East Bengal:

East Bengal Football Club Captains
Season	Nationality	Name
1920–21	(British Raj) India	Ramesh Chandra "Nosa" Sen
1921–22	(British Raj) India	Ramesh Chandra "Nosa" Sen
1922–23	(British Raj) India	Ramesh Chandra "Nosa" Sen
1923–24	(British Raj) India	Manindra Dutta Ray
1924–25	(British Raj) India	Hemanga Basu
1925–26	(British Raj) India	Mona Dutta
1926–27	(British Raj) India	Noni Gossain
1927–28	(British Raj) India	Surjo Chakraborty
1928–29	(British Raj) India	Moni Das
1929–30	(British Raj) India	Mona Moulik
1930–31	(British Raj) India	Mona Moulik
1931–32	(British Raj) India	Mona Moulik
1932–33	(British Raj) India	Moni Talukdar
1933–34	(British Raj) India	Moni Talukdar
1934–35	(British Raj) India	Kamal Ganguly
1935–36	(British Raj) India	Dulal Guha Thakurta
1936–37	(British Raj) India	Dulal Guha Thakurta
1937–38	(British Raj) India	P Majumdar
1938–39	(British Raj) India	Promodh Dasgupta
1939–40	(British Raj) India	Promodh Dasgupta
1940–41	(British Raj) India	Promodh Dasgupta
1941–42	(British Raj) India	Ajit Nandi
1942–43	(British Raj) India	A.C. Somana
1943–44	(British Raj) India	Rakhal Majumdar
1944–45	(British Raj) India	Sunil Ghosh
1945–46	(British Raj) India	Poritosh Chakraborty
1946–47	(British Raj) India	Mandipalli Appa Rao
1947–48	India	Nogen Ray
1948–49	India	Dhirendranath Chandra
1949–50	India	Syed M. Kaiser
1950–51	India	P. B. A. Saleh
1951–52	India	Byomkesh Bose
1952–53	India	Pansanttom Venkatesh
1953–54	India	K. P. Dhanraj
1954–55	India	Ahmed Khan
1955–56	India	G. R. Gokul
1956–57	India	Dr. S Dasgupta
1957–58	India	Dr. Prakashananda Kumar
1958–59	India	Sudhir Kumar Karmakar
1959–60	India	Bir Bahadur Gurung
1960–61	India	Ram Bahadur
1961–62	India	Tulsidas Balaram
1962–63	India	Chitto Chanda
1963–64	India	Balu
1964–65	India	Abani Basu
1965–66	India	Sukumar Samajpati
1966–67	India	Chandan Bannerjee
1967–68	India	Prasanta Sinha
1968–69	India	Parimal Dey
1969–70	India	Peter Thangaraj
1970–71	India	Shanto Mitra
1971–72	India	Sunil Bhattacharya
1972–73	India	Sudhir Karmakar
1973–74	India	Swapan Sengupta
1974–75	India	Samaresh Choudhury
1975–76	India	Ashoklal Bannerjee
1976–77	India	Gautam Sarkar
1977–78	India	Shyamal Ghosh
1978–79	India	Surajit Sengupta
1979–80	India	Prasanta Banerjee
1980–81	India	Satyajit Mitra
1981–82	India	Monoranjan Bhattacharya
1982–83	India	Victor Amalraj
1983–84	India	Mihir Bose
1984–85	India	Bhaskar Ganguly
1985–86	India	Balai Mukherjee
1986–87	India	Tarun Dey
1987–88	India	Aloke Saha
1988–89	India	Bikash Panji
1989–90	India	Krishanu Dey
1990–91	Nigeria	Chima Okorie
1991–92	India	Bikash Panji
1992–93	India	Kuljit Singh
1993–94	India	Ilyas Pasha
1994–95	India	Swarup Das
1995–96	India	Tushar Rakshit
1996–97	India	Sumit Mukherjee
1997–98	India	Dulal Biswas
1998–99	India	Amitava Chanda
1999–00	India	Carlton Chapman
2000–01	India	Bijen Singh
2001–02	India	Falguni Dutta
2002–03	India	Anit Ghosh
2003–04	Ghana	Suley Musah
2004–05	India	Sangram Mukherjee
2005–06	India	Dipankar Roy
2005–06	India	Bhaichung Bhutia
2006–07	India	Alvito D'Cunha
2007–08	India	Chandan Das
2008–09	India	Muttah Suresh
2009–10	India	Syed Rahim Nabi
2010–11	India	Saumik Dey
2011–12	India	Abhra Mondal
2012–13	India	Sanju Pradhan
2013–14	India	Mehtab Hossain
2014–15	India	Harmanjot Khabra
2015–16	India	Gurwinder Singh
2016–17	India	Robert Lalthlamuana
2016–17	India	Lalrindika Ralte
2017–18	India	Arnab Mondal
2018–19	India	Lalrindika Ralte
2019–20	India	Lalrindika Ralte
2020–21	Scotland	Danny Fox
2021–22	India	Arindam Bhattacharya
2022–23	Spain	Iván González
2022–23	India	Kamaljit Singh
2022–23	India	Souvik Chakrabarti
2022–23	India	Sumeet Passi
2022–23	Brazil	Cleiton Silva
2023–24	Brazil	Cleiton Silva
2024–25	Brazil	Cleiton Silva
2025–26	India	Naorem Mahesh Singh
2025–26	India	Mohammad Rakip
