= 1950 IFA Shield final =

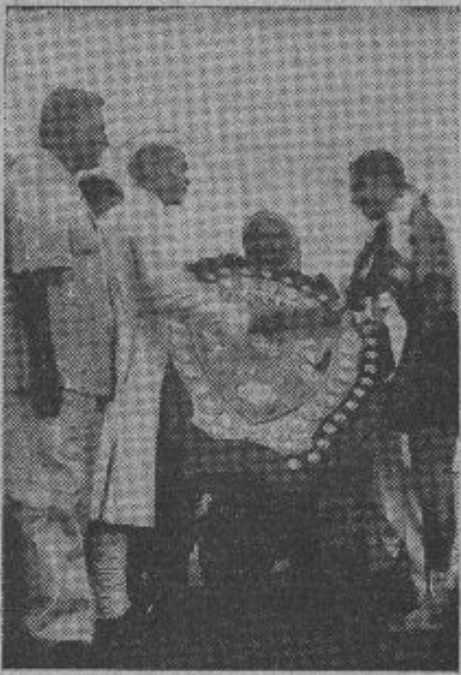
- PBA Saleh receiving the IFA Shield trophy from West Bengal Governor Dr. Kailashnath Katju
- Event: 1950 IFA Shield
East Bengal	Services
3	0
- Date: 16 September 1950
- Venue: East Bengal–Mohun Bagan Ground, Kolkata, West Bengal
- Referee: Alok Ray

The 1950 IFA Shield final was the 58th final of the IFA Shield, the second oldest football competition in India, and was contested between Kolkata giants East Bengal and Services on 16 September 1950 at the East Bengal–Mohun Bagan Ground in Kolkata.

East Bengal won the final 3–0 to claim their 4th IFA Shield title. K. P. Dhanraj scored twice and P. B. A. Saleh scored the third as East Bengal lifted their fourth IFA Shield title.

== Route to the final ==
East Bengal		Round	Services	
Opponent	Result	Round	Opponent	Result
Howrah Union	4–0	First Round	Eastern India Railway	2–0
Munger Town	4–0	Second Round	bye	–
Calcutta F.C.	3–0	Third Round	Maharashtra	3–0
Bhawanipore	1–0	Quarter–Final	Kalighat	0–0; 4–0
Sporting Union	2–1	Semi–Final	Mohun Bagan	2–1

== Match ==
=== Summary ===
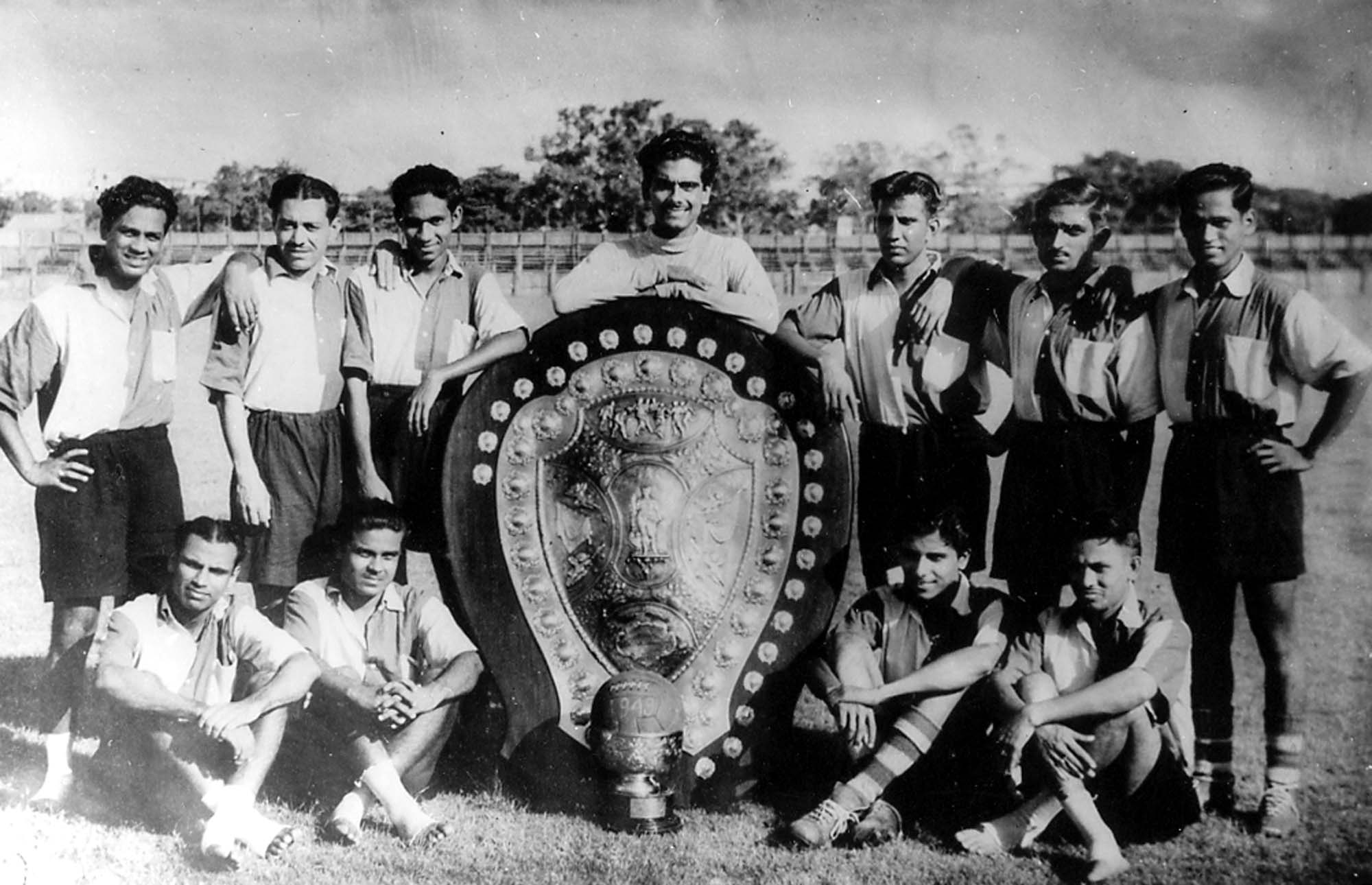
East Bengal team with the 1950 IFA Shield trophy.

The IFA Shield final began at the East Bengal–Mohun Bagan Ground in Kolkata on 16 September 1950 in front of a packed crowd as Kolkata giants East Bengal faced Services. East Bengal, the defending champions, reached their seventh final, having won thrice in 1943, 1945 and 1949, after defeating Sporting Union 2–1 in the semi-final. Services made their first appearance in the final after they defeated Kolkata giants Mohun Bagan 2–1 in the semi-final. This was the first time that the IFA Shield final was being held at the East Bengal–Mohun Bagan Ground.

East Bengal started as the favorites in front of their home crowd as the defending champions and with a star-studded forward line consisting of the famous Pancha Pandavas, East Bengal dominated the game from the beginning and scored the first goal in the eighth minute of the match after Pansanttom Venkatesh and Apparao interchanged between themselves and put a forward pass for K. P. Dhanraj who scored through a powerful grounded shot to make it 1–0. East Bengal doubled their lead just five minutes before the half time after P. B. A. Saleh scored with a grounder, after he was set through on goal by Ahmed Khan. East Bengal scored their third goal just ten minutes before the end of the play after Apparao again played Dhanraj through on goal, who got his second of the match as East Bengal won their fourth IFA Shield title and thus became the first-ever club to win the coveted Double – League and Shield champions for the third time (previously: 1945 and 1949), surpassing the record held by Gordon Highlanders (1908 and 1909), Calcutta FC (1922 and 1923) and Mohammedan Sporting (1936 and 1941); who had won the double twice.

=== Details ===
16 September 1950
16:00 IST

East Bengal	3–0	Services
Dhanraj 8', 40'; Saleh 20'

East Bengal–Mohun Bagan Ground, Kolkata
Attendance: 20,000 (est.)
Referee: Alok Ray

East Bengal	Services

GK	(India) Manilal Ghatak
FB	(India) N. Guha
FB	(India) Rakhal Mazumdar
HB	(India) Dhirendranath Chanda
HB	(India) Biren Ray
HB	(India) G. R. Gokul
FW	(India) Pansanttom Venkatesh
FW	(India) M. Apparao
FW	(India) K. P. Dhanraj
FW	(India) Ahmed Khan
FW	(India) P. B. A. Saleh (c)

GK	(India) Khem Bahadur
FB	(India) John
FB	(India) Ranbir Singh
HB	(India) Lal Bahadur (Jr.)
HB	(India) Chandan Singh
HB	(India) Cpt. Jones
FW	(India) Dil Bahadur (Sr.)
FW	(India) Lal Bahadur (Sr.)
FW	(India) Tikaram
FW	(India) Simon
FW	(India) Puran Bahadur (c)

Match rules

- 50 minutes.
- Joint winners if both finals ends in a draw
