= 1951 IFA Shield final =

- Event: 1951 IFA Shield
Mohun Bagan	East Bengal
- East Bengal won after a replay

Final
Mohun Bagan	East Bengal
0	0
- Date: 11 September 1951
- Venue: East Bengal–Mohun Bagan Ground, Kolkata, West Bengal
- Referee: Major F. Upfold
- Attendance: 16,000 (estd.)

Replay
Mohun Bagan	East Bengal
0	2
- Date: 18 September 1951
- Venue: East Bengal–Mohun Bagan Ground, Kolkata, West Bengal
- Referee: Major F. Upfold
- Attendance: 16,000 (estd.)

The 1951 IFA Shield final was the 59th final of the IFA Shield, the second oldest football competition in India, and was contested between Kolkata giants East Bengal and Mohun Bagan on 11 September 1951 first which ended in a draw and then a replay on 18 September 1951 at the East Bengal–Mohun Bagan Ground in Kolkata.

East Bengal won the final 2–0 to claim their 5th IFA Shield title. P. B. A. Saleh scored both the goals in the replay final as East Bengal lifted their fifth IFA Shield title.

== Route to the final ==
East Bengal		Round	Mohun Bagan	
Opponent	Result	Round	Opponent	Result
Customs	3–1	Second Round	Benetola	0–0; 1–0
24 Parganas	3–1	Third Round	East Punjab	2–0
Maharashtra XI	3–1	Quarter–Final	Cuttack XI	0–0; 1–0
Rajasthan	3–0	Semi–Final	Mohammedan Sporting	4–0

== Match ==
=== Summary ===
The IFA Shield final began at the East Bengal-Mohun Bagan Ground in Kolkata on 11 September 1951 in front of a packed crowd as Kolkata giants East Bengal and Mohun Bagan faced each other in a Kolkata Derby. East Bengal, the two-time defending champions, reached their eighth final after defeating Rajasthan 3–0 in the semi-final, having won the title four times in 1943, 1945, 1949, and 1950. Mohun Bagan also made their eighth appearance in the final after they defeated another Kolkata giant Mohammedan Sporting 4–0 in the semi-final, having won it thrice previously in 1911, 1947, and 1948.

East Bengal started as the favorites as the two-time defending champions and with a star-studded forward line consisting of the famous Pancha Pandavas. However, Mohun Bagan got the best chance of the match in the tenth minute of the game when Runu Guha Thakurta played Babu open on goal but the latter missed his chance from five yards. Rabi Das too missed another chance in the twelfth minute after failing to control the ball. East Bengal managed to make a few moves but was denied by Mohun Bagan custodian C. Banerjee. Both teams failed to break the deadlock and the game ended in a 0–0 draw.

=== Details ===
11 September 1951
16:00 IST

Mohun Bagan	0–0	East Bengal

East Bengal-Mohun Bagan Ground, Kolkata
Attendance: 16,000 (est.)
Referee: Major F. Upfold

Mohun Bagan	East Bengal

GK	(India) Chanchal Banerjee
FB	(India) Purnendu Barua
FB	(India) Sailen Manna (c)
HB	(India) Ratan Sen
HB	(India) Talimeren Ao
HB	(India) Robi Dey
FW	(India) Babu
FW	(India) Runu Guha Thakurta
FW	(India) Rabi Das
FW	(India) Sattar Singh
FW	(India) A. Dasgupta

GK	(India) Manilal Ghatak
FB	(India) Byomkesh Bose (c)
FB	(India) Ansari
HB	(India) G. R. Gokul
HB	(India) Chandan Singh
HB	(India) S. Ray
FW	(India) Pansanttom Venkatesh
FW	(India) M. Apparao
FW	(India) K. P. Dhanraj
FW	(India) Ahmed Khan
FW	(India) P. B. A. Saleh

Match rules

- 50 minutes.
- Replay if scores still level.
- No Substitutes.

== Replay ==
=== Summary ===
The replay final began at the East Bengal-Mohun Bagan Ground in Kolkata on 18 September 1951 after the first game ended in a 0–0 stalemate.

East Bengal made a fast start and scored early just in the second minute after P. B. A. Saleh latched onto a pass from K. P. Dhanraj and found the net with a powerful strike to make it 1–0. Mohun Bagan tried to make a comeback in the match but was denied by the East Bengal defense. East Bengal doubled their lead in the nineteenth minute of the match after Saleh once again found himself at the end of a cross from Pansanttom Venkatesh and finished from close range to make it 2–0 before halftime. In the second half, Mohun Bagan created a few chances but East Bengal custodian Manilal Ghatak was able to keep a clean sheet as East Bengal emerged victorious to lift their fifth IFA Shield title, and thus become the first Indian team to lift the title three consecutive times. British regimental teams Gordon Highlanders (1908–10), Calcutta (1922–24), and Sherwood Foresters (1926–28) had achieved this feat previously.

=== Details ===
18 September 1951
16:00 IST

Mohun Bagan	0–2	East Bengal
		Saleh 2', 19'

East Bengal-Mohun Bagan Ground, Kolkata
Attendance: 16,000 (est.)
Referee: Major F. Upfold

Mohun Bagan	East Bengal

GK	(India) Chanchal Banerjee
FB	(India) Purnendu Barua
FB	(India) Sailen Manna (c)
HB	(India) Ratan Sen
HB	(India) Talimeren Ao
HB	(India) Robi Dey
FW	(India) Babu
FW	(India) Runu Guha Thakurta
FW	(India) Rabi Das
FW	(India) Sattar Singh
FW	(India) A. Dasgupta

GK	(India) Manilal Ghatak
FB	(India) Byomkesh Bose (c)
FB	(India) Ansari
HB	(India) G. R. Gokul
HB	(India) Chandan Singh
HB	(India) S. Ray
FW	(India) Pansanttom Venkatesh
FW	(India) M. Apparao
FW	(India) K. P. Dhanraj
FW	(India) Ahmed Khan
FW	(India) P. B. A. Saleh

Match rules

- 50 minutes.
- Joint winners if both finals ends in a draw.
- No Substitutes.
