= East Bengal Club Season Awards =

Seasonal awards conferred by East Bengal Club

The East Bengal Club Season Awards are the official East Bengal awards presented on 1 August to various recipients in the Foundation Day celebrations of the club. The Inaugural award was handed out in 2011 which had three categories the highlight 'Bharat Gourav Award', the 'Lifetime Achievement Award' and the 'Player of the Season Award'.

== Awards ceremony ==
East Bengal Club was founded on 1 August 1920 and every year on this day, the club celebrates its Foundation Day. Since 2011, the awards ceremony was launched by the club to commemorate and honour different sporting personalities as per the categories. The highest honour "Bharat Gaurav" award is handed out each year to honour outstanding sports personalities who have made the country proud in different fields of sports. Along with the "Bharat Gaurav" award, the club also presents two lifetime achievement awards namely "Dr Ramesh Chandra (Nosa) Sen Memorial Lifetime Achievement Award" and "Byomkesh Bose Memorial Lifetime Achievement Award" in respect of two former legends of the club, to honour former players and sportspersons who have represented the club. Along with these, the club also awards the "Player of the Season" to the best player of the previous season. The club also awards two awards dedicated to sports journalists namely the "Ajoy Bose Memorial Journalism Award" and "Pushpen Sarkar Memorial Photo-Journalism Award". The club also hands over the "Pankaj Gupta Memorial and Pratul Gupta Memorial Referee Award" to various referees from Kolkata maidan.

== Winners ==
=== Bharat Gaurav Award ===
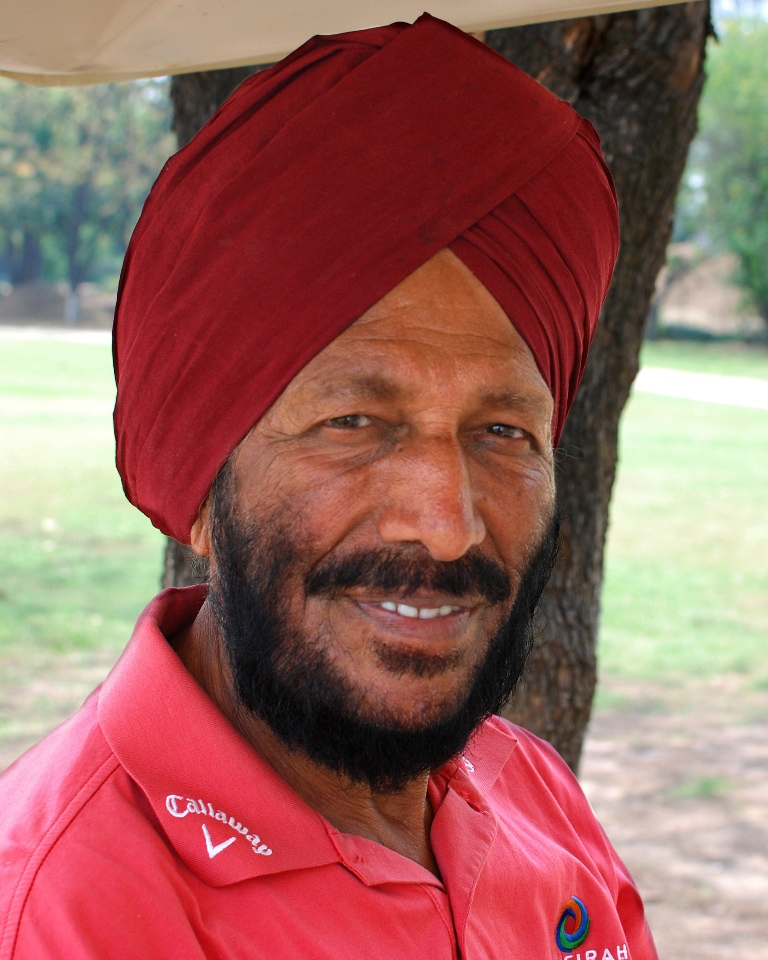
Milkha Singh - recipient of the Bharat Gourav award in 2016.

East Bengal Club had constituted the ‘Bharat Gaurav Award' in 2011, as the highest decoration by the club to honour the outstanding sports personalities who had made India proud in different fields of sports. Three times Olympic Champion and Indian Hockey legend Leslie Claudius was the first recipient of the award in 2011. The club has awarded the likes of Ahmed Khan, Arun Ghosh, Bachendri Pal, Milkha Singh, Dhanraj Pillay, Gurbux Singh, Kapil Dev since then. The award was not presented in two years 2020 and 2021 due to COVID-19 pandemic in India. In 2022 the awards were once again presented, with former India women's national cricket team captain Jhulan Goswami and tennis star Leander Paes jointly awarded the honour by the club.

Year	Recipient	Sport Field	Ref
2011	Leslie Claudius	Field hockey	
2012	Ahmed Khan	Football	
2013	Arun Ghosh	Football	
2014	Bachendri Pal	Mountaineering	
2015	Mohammed Habib	Football	
2016	Milkha Singh	Sprint	
2017	Dhanraj Pillay	Field hockey	
2018	Gurbux Singh	Field hockey	
2019	Kapil Dev	Cricket	
2020	not awarded		(Note: Due to the COVID-19 pandemic in India, the East Bengal Foundation day awards were put on hold.)
2021	not awarded		(Note: Due to the COVID-19 pandemic in India, the East Bengal Foundation day awards were put on hold for the second consecutive year.)
2022	Jhulan Goswami	Cricket	
2022	Leander Paes	Tennis	
2023	Ratan Tata	Industrialist	
2024	Sourav Ganguly	Cricket	

=== Player of the Season Award ===
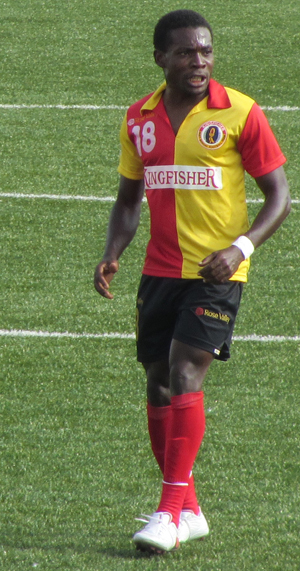
Penn Orji - recipient of the Player of the Season award in 2012.

East Bengal had constituted the 'Player of the Season Award' in 2011 to honour the best football player of the previous season. It is decided by the Executive Members committee. Mehtab Hossain was the first recipient in 2011.

However, the first Player of the Season title was awarded at the end of the 2007–08 season, given by the then official marketing partner - Ideas Unlimited, with goalkeeper Subrata Paul being the winner.

Year	Nationality	Recipient	Position	Ref
2008	India	Subrata Paul	Goalkeeper	
2011	India	Mehtab Hossain	Midfielder	
2012	Nigeria	Penn Orji	Midfielder	
2013	India	Saumik Dey	Defender	
2014	India	Arnab Mondal	Defender	
2015	India	Robert Lalthlamuana	Defender	
2016	South Korea	Do Dong-hyun	Forward	
2017	India	Gurwinder Singh	Defender	
2018	Syria	Mahmoud Amnah	Midfielder	
2019	India	Laldanmawia Ralte	Midfielder	
2020	not awarded			
2021	not awarded			
2022	not awarded			
2023	Brazil	Cleiton Silva	Forward	
2024	India	Nandhakumar Sekar	Forward	

=== Lifetime Achievement Award ===
East Bengal had constituted the 'Lifetime Achievement Award' in 2011 to honour a legendary sports personality of the club. It is decided by the Executive Members committee. India and East Bengal Legend Sudhir Karmakar and Sukumar Samajpati were the first recipients of this award in 2011.

Year	Nationality	Recipient	Position	Ref
2011	India	Sudhir Karmakar	Defender	
2011	India	Sukumar Samajpati	Defender	
2012	India	Prasanta Sinha	Midfielder	
2012	India	Santo Mitra	Defender	
2013	India	Samaresh Chowdhury	Midfielder	
2013	India	Abani Bose	Goalkeeper	
2014	India	Amal Dutta	Defender	
2014	India	Parimal Dey	Forward	
2015	India	Chandan Banerjee	Defender	
2016	India	Shyamal Ghosh	Defender	
2016	India	Shyam Thapa	Forward	
2017	India	Subhash Bhowmick	Forward	
2018	India	Sunil Bhattacharya	Defender	
2018	India	Surajit Sengupta	Forward	
2019	India	Monoranjan Bhattacharya	Defender	
2019	India	Bhaskar Ganguly	Goalkeeper	
2020	not awarded			
2021	not awarded			
2022	India	Gautam Sarkar	Midfielder	
2022	India	Swapan Sengupta	Midfielder	
2023	India	Tarun Bose	Goalkeeper	
2024	India	Ranjit Mukherjee	Forward	
2024	India	Prasanta Banerjee	Midfielder	

=== Academy Player of the Year Award ===
East Bengal had constituted the 'Academy Player of the Year Award' in 2018 to honour the best football player of the East Bengal FC Academy for the previous season. It is decided by the Executive Members committee. Manoj Mohammed and PC Rohlupuia were the first recipients of this award in 2018.

Year	Nationality	Recipient	Position	Ref
2018	India	Manoj Mohammed	Defender	
2018	India	PC Rohlupuia	Midfielder	
2019	not awarded			
2020	not awarded			
2021	not awarded			

=== Special awards ===
On the occasion of the centenary celebrations of the club in 2019, a set of special awards were awarded to sports personalities associated with the East Bengal club.

Award Name	Nationality	Recipient	Ref
Coach of Coaches award	India	P. K. Banerjee	
Best Foreign Player award	Iran	Majid Bishkar	
