= 1949 IFA Shield final =

- Event: 1949 IFA Shield
| East Bengal | Mohun Bagan |
| 2 | 0 |
- Date: 15 September 1949
- Venue: Calcutta Ground, Kolkata, West Bengal
- Referee: Major F. Upfold
- Attendance: 15,000

The 1949 IFA Shield final was the 56th final of the IFA Shield, the second oldest football competition in India, and was contested between Kolkata giants East Bengal and Mohun Bagan on 15 September 1949 at the Calcutta Ground in Kolkata.

East Bengal won the final 2–0 to claim their 3rd IFA Shield title. Pansanttom Venkatesh and Ahmed Khan scored the two goals as East Bengal lifted their third IFA Shield title.

== Route to the final ==
| East Bengal | | Round | Mohun Bagan | |
|---|---|---|---|---|
| Opponent | Result | Round | Opponent | Result |
| Eastern India Railway | 2–0 | Second Round | Kalighat | 1–0 |
| Raisina Sporting | 4–0 | Third Round | Rajasthan | 1–0 |
| Silchar Town | 6–0 | Quarter–Final | Mohammedan Sporting | 2–0 |
| Maharana Club | 8–0 | Semi–Final | New Delhi Heroes | 4–1 |

== Match ==
=== Summary ===
The IFA Shield final began at the Calcutta Ground in Kolkata on 15 September 1949 in front of a packed crowd as Kolkata giants East Bengal and Mohun Bagan faced each other in a Kolkata Derby. East Bengal reached their sixth final, having won twice in 1943 and 1945, after defeating Maharana Club 8–0 in the semi-final. Mohun Bagan, the two-time defending champions, made their fourth consecutive appearance in the final after they defeated New Delhi Heroes 4–1 in the semi-final.

Mohun Bagan was the first to attack in the very first minute as Runu Guha Thakurta passed to Selim and the latter set Rashid on move with a backpass but Taj Mohammed intercepted the attack near the East Bengal goal. Selim got another chance immediately after but he shot wide after being played through by Nayar. East Bengal slowly got back into the game and made their first attack in the seventh minute as P. B. A. Saleh shot over the bar after receiving a pass from Pansanttom Venkatesh. East Bengal opened the scoring in the fourteenth minute after Apparao provided a forward pass to Venkatesh, who sped away from two defenders and beat Mohun Bagan custodian D. Sen with a left-footed shot to make it 1–0. In the twenty-third minute, East Bengal doubled the lead, after Saleh rolled the ball to Ahmed Khan who sent an angular shot into the net through a number of legs to make it 2–0. In the second half, Mohun Bagan made several attempts to get back into the game but Manilal Ghatak managed to keep a clean sheet as East Bengal emerged victorious and lifted their third IFA Shield title, also managing to win the coveted Double of winning both the League and Shield for the second time in their history, after 1945.

=== Details ===
15 September 1949
14:00 IST

| East Bengal | 2–0 | Mohun Bagan |
|---|---|---|
| Venkatesh 14'; Khan 23' | Report |

Calcutta Ground, Kolkata
Attendance: 30,000 (est.)
Referee: Major F. Upfold

| East Bengal | Mohun Bagan |

| GK | (India) Manilal Ghatak |
| FB | (India) Byomkesh Bose |
| FB | (India) Taj Mohammed |
| HB | (India) Dhirendranath Chanda |
| HB | (India) S. M. Kaiser (c) |
| HB | (India) Khogen Sen |
| FW | (India) Pansanttom Venkatesh |
| FW | (India) M. Apparao |
| FW | (India) K. P. Dhanraj |
| FW | (India) Ahmed Khan |
| FW | (India) P. B. A. Saleh |

| GK | (India) D. Sen |
| FB | (India) Dr. P. Kumar |
| FB | (India) Debu Pal |
| HB | (India) Anil Dey (c) |
| HB | (India) Talimeren Ao |
| HB | (India) Abhoy Ghosh |
| FW | (India) Rashid |
| FW | (India) Runu Guha Thakurta |
| FW | (India) Selim |
| FW | (India) Amol Mazumdar |
| FW | (India) Swami Nayar |

Match rules

- 50 minutes.
- Joint winners if both finals ends in a draw
