= 1973 IFA Shield final =

- Event: 1973 IFA Shield
East Bengal	Pyongyang City
(India)	(North Korea)
3	1
- Date: 27 September 1973
- Venue: East Bengal Ground, Kolkata, West Bengal
- Referee: T. N. Lao (Delhi)

The 1973 IFA Shield final was the 77th final of the IFA Shield, the second oldest football competition in India, and was contested between Kolkata giant East Bengal and Pyongyang City of DPR Korea on 27 September 1973 at the East Bengal Ground in Kolkata.

East Bengal won the final 3–1 to claim their 12th IFA Shield title. Mohammed Akbar scored twice while Subhash Bhowmick scored the other goal for East Bengal in the final as they lifted their twelfth IFA Shield title.

== Match ==
=== Summary ===
The IFA Shield final began at the East Bengal Ground in Kolkata on 27 September 1973 in front of a packed crowd as Kolkata giant East Bengal, the defending champions faced Pyongyang City of DPR Korea. East Bengal had previously won the tournament eleven times and reached the finals defeating Selangor of Malaysia 3–0 in the semi-finals.

East Bengal dominated the proceedings from the beginning and took an early lead in the fifth minute when Subhash Bhowmick took a free-kick which when fisted by the Pyongyang custodian, fell onto the feet of Mohammed Akbar who scored from close range to make it 1–0. Subhash Bhowmick once again found himself new the Pyongyang box in the tenth minute and he dribbled past three defenders to score the second as East Bengal took a 2–0 lead within ten minutes. The North Korean team tried to make a comeback and reduced the margin the seventy-second minute as their forward Gun Chang-Gap scored to make it 2–1 but it was Mohammed Akbar again just a few minutes later, with a powerful grounded effort scored for East Bengal and made it 3–1 as East Bengal held onto the lead until fulltime and successfully defended their IFA Shield title and lifted the Shield for the twelfth time.

=== Details ===
27 September 1973
14:30 IST

East Bengal (India)	3–1	(North Korea) Pyongyang City
Mohammed Akbar 5', 75'; Bhowmick 10'		Gun Chang-Gap 72'

East Bengal Ground, Kolkata
Attendance: 30,000 (est.)
Referee: T. N. Lao (Delhi)

East Bengal	Pyongyang

GK	(India) Arun Banerjee
RB	(India) Sudhir Karmakar
CB	(India) Ashokelal Banerjee
CB	(India) Shyamal Ghosh
LB	(India) Prabir Majumdar
CM	(India) Gautam Sarkar
CM	(India) Samaresh Chowdhury
RW	(India) Swapan Sengupta (c)
LW	(India) Subhash Bhowmick
ST	(India) Mohammed Habib
ST	(India) Mohammed Akbar
Head Coach:
(India) P. K. Banerjee

GK	(North Korea) Lee Jong-Seong
RB	(North Korea) Ji Jong-Hi	Substituted off
CB	(North Korea) Un Chi-Yong
CB	(North Korea) Kim Goang-Ho
LB	(North Korea) Hwang Sang-Jim
CM	(North Korea) Kim Giong-Mukh
CM	(North Korea) Kim Pi-Dok
RW	(North Korea) Hang Un-Sang	Substituted off
LW	(North Korea) Choi Goang-Nam (c)
ST	(North Korea) Gun Chang-Gap
ST	(North Korea) Miyong Dong-Chang
Substitutes:
RB	(North Korea) So On-Heok	Substituted in
RW	(North Korea) Jong Man-Sap	Substituted in
Head coach:
—

Match rules

- 90 minutes.
- Joint winners if both finals ends in a draw

== See also ==
- IFA Shield Finals
