= S. M. Kaiser =

Indian footballer

Personal information
- Full name: Syed M Kaiser
- Position: Midfielder

Senior career*
Years	Team	Apps	(Gls)
- East Bengal

International career
- India
- * Club domestic league appearances and goals

S. M. Kaiser was a former Indian association football player who played for Calcutta Football League side East Bengal. He was part of the India national squad that competed at the 1948 Summer Olympics in London against France. He captained East Bengal in 1949–50.

== Honours ==
East Bengal

- IFA Shield: 1945, 1949
