= Ahmed Khan (footballer) =

Indian footballer (1926–2017)

Personal information
- Full name: Ahmed Muhammad Khan
- Date of birth: 24 December 1926
- Date of death: 27 August 2017 (aged 90)
- Place of death: Bengaluru, Karnataka, India
- Position: Forward

Senior career*
Years	Team	Apps	(Gls)
- Bangalore Muslim Club
1948–1959	East Bengal	35+	(63)

International career
- India
Medal record
Men's football
Representing India
Asian Games
Gold medal – first place	1951 New Delhi	Team
- * Club domestic league appearances and goals

Ahmed Mohammed Khan (24 December 1926 – 27 August 2017) was an Indian footballer who played as a forward. He participated in the 1948 and 1952 Summer Olympics. He was also vice-captain of India from 1949 to 1954.

Khan, known for his ball controlling skills and creativity in forward position predominantly during his spell in East Bengal from 1949 to 1959, was later idolized by Indian international Chuni Goswami.

== Club career ==
Khan played in the 1948 and 1952 Summer Olympics and figured for East Bengal from 1949 to 1959, and captained the team in 1954–55. He spent most of his club career in East Bengal. Khan was part of the team that played against German side Kickers Offenbach and FC Torpedo Moscow in 1953. In the same year, he went on to play for the team at the World Youth Festival in Bucharest, Romania. He netted one in their 6–1 victory against Lebanon XI.

He was also one of the "Pancha Pandavas" of the club who, besides him, comprised forwards Dhanraj, Appa Rao, Saleh and Venkatesh. They all helped East Bengal bag the prestigious IFA Shield, Calcutta Football League and Rovers Cup in 1949 and become the first Indian club to win the Durand Cup in 1951. He also played for Bangalore Muslims FC.

== International career ==
He made his Olympic debut in 1948 London Olympics, where Balaidas Chatterjee managed India lost 1–2 to heavyweight France. He also won gold at the 1951 Asian Games, held in New Delhi. At the 1952 Summer Olympics in Helsinki, Khan played under Sailen Manna's captaincy, but India was thrashed by Yugoslavia 10–1. He scored India's lone goal in that match.

Khan later participated in 1953 Asian Quadrangular Football Tournament in Rangoon with Balaidas Chatterjee managed team, and won the title. He was also part of the Indian team in an exhibition match in December 1954, in an 1–0 defeat to Allsvenskan club AIK at CC&FC Ground in Kolkata.

== Honours ==
Bangalore Muslims

- Rovers Cup: 1948

East Bengal

- IFA Shield: 1949, 1950, 1951, 1958
- Durand Cup: 1951, 1952, 1956
- Calcutta Football League: 1949, 1950, 1952
- Rovers Cup: 1949
- DCM Trophy: 1950, 1952, 1957
- Dr. H. K. Mookherjee Shield: 1957
- P. K. Nair Gold Cup: 1956

India

- Asian Games Gold medal: 1951
- Asian Quadrangular Football Tournament: 1953, 1954

Individual

- East Bengal Best Forward of the Millennium
- East Bengal "Bharat Gaurav Award": 2012

== See also ==
- List of East Bengal Club captains
- Pancha Pandavas
- India national football team at the Olympics

== Bibliography ==
- Kapadia, Novy (2017). Barefoot to Boots: The Many Lives of Indian Football. Penguin Random House. ISBN 978-0-143-42641-7.
- Dineo, Paul; Mills, James (2001). Soccer in South Asia: Empire, Nation, Diaspora. London, United Kingdom: Frank Cass Publishers. p. 33. ISBN 978-0-7146-8170-2. Archived from the original on 25 July 2022.
- Majumdar, Boria, Bandyopadhyay, Kausik (2006). Goalless: The Story of a Unique Footballing Nation. Penguin India. ISBN 9780670058747.
- Martinez, Dolores; Mukharjiim, Projit B (2009). Football: From England to the World: The Many Lives of Indian Football. Routledge. ISBN 978-1-138-88353-6. Archived from the original on 2 July 2022.
- Nath, Nirmal (2011). History of Indian Football: Upto 2009–10. Readers Service. ISBN 9788187891963. Archived from the original on 22 July 2022.
- "Triumphs and Disasters: The Story of Indian Football, 1889—2000" (PDF). Archived from the original (PDF) on 13 August 2012.
- Roy, Gautam (1 January 2021). East Bengal 100. Allsport Foundation. ISBN 978-8194763109.
- Chattopadhyay, Hariprasad (2017). Mohun Bagan–East Bengal (in Bengali). Kolkata: Parul Prakashan.
- Majumdar, Boria; Bandyopadhyay, Kausik (2006). A Social History Of Indian Football: Striving To Score. Routledge. ISBN 9780415348355. Archived from the original on 29 June 2021.
- Basu, Jaydeep (2003). Stories from Indian Football. UBS Publishers' Distributors. ISBN 9788174764546. Archived from the original on 11 October 2022.
