= Pancha Pandavas =

Five Indian football players, 1949–1953

In Indian football, Pancha Pandavas (Bengali pronunciation: [/ˈpɔñtʃo pāṇɖob/]) or VADAS, refers to the East Bengal penta-forward-line consisting of Ahmed Khan, Appa Rao, P. Venkatesh, P.B.A. Saleh and K. P. Dhanraj, who played together for the club from 1949 to 1953. During the Pandavas era at East Bengal, the club won 11 major trophies, had success against foreign opponents, and was adjudged as the best team in Asia by the English FA annual almanac in 1951–52. East Bengal made their maiden trip to Europe during this era. The Pandavas were impressive against their European opponents and even drew a match against the 1952 Soviet Cup champions, Torpedo Moscow. The penta-forward lineup scored more than 250 goals for the club during their spell together. K. P. Dhanraj, the centre-forward, became the all-time top scorer for East Bengal, a record he held for four decades.

== History ==
The 2-3-5 formation

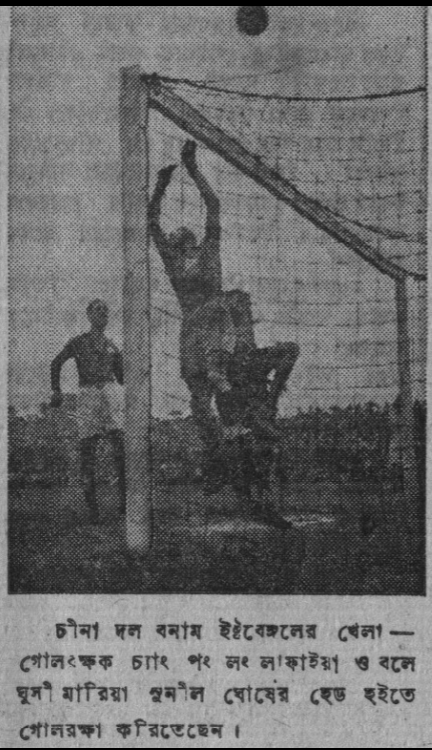
East Bengal vs China Olympic Team in action - photo from Jugantor newspaper 15 July 1948.

The "Pancha Pandavas" of Indian football are the five forwards, who played for the Kolkata club, East Bengal, from 1949 to 1953— Ahmed Khan, Appa Rao, P. Venkatesh, P.B.A. Saleh and K. P. Dhanraj. The Hindu epic, the Mahabharata, in which the five (Pancha) sons of Kuru King Pandu were called "Pandava" inspired the name. They were also nicknamed the VADAS, a collective name formed using their initials. Mamidipalli Appa Rao (1911-1978), the most senior of them, who was from Kakianda, joined East Bengal in 1941 and played for 15 consecutive seasons until 1955, the longest of any Pandava. Appa Rao was part of the East Bengal squad that won their first-ever Calcutta Football League title in 1942 and the IFA Shield title in 1943. P.B.A. Saleh, who hailed from Kottayam Kerala, joined the club in 1945, and helped them win their first League and Shield double in his first season. Pansanttom Venkatesh joined in 1948, while India national football team members Ahmed Khan and K. P. Dhanraj, who were part of the 1948 Olympics squad, joined East Bengal in 1949; all were from Mysore. Together they played for five seasons and earned the nickname "Pancha Pandavas" from East Bengal fans as they established one of the most successful eras for the East Bengal club.

The Pancha Pandavas were all forwards, playing in the traditional 2-3-5 formation. Venkatesh and Saleh were the right and left outside-forwards respectively, Ahmed Khan, who is regarded as one of the greatest-ever players to play for East Bengal, was the left inside-forward while the senior Appa Rao was the right inside-forward and the prolific K. P. Dhanraj was the team's centre-forward.

In their very first season together in 1949, they helped the club win a famous treble of the Calcutta Football League, the IFA Shield and the Rovers Cup. East Bengal won the Calcutta League title with 45 points from 26 matches, scoring 77 goals. The star-studded East Bengal lineup was on a scoring spree in the IFA Shield too as they defeated: EIR 2–0 in the first round, Delhi Raisina Sporting 4–0 in the second round, Silchar Town 6–0 in the quarter-finals and Maharana Club 8–0 in the semi-finals, and arch-rivals Mohun Bagan 2–0 in the final. With Venkatesh and Ahmed Khan scoring the goals in the final, they scored 22 goals in five matches as they lifted the IFA Shield trophy. K.P. Dhanraj alone scored 10 goals, including a hat-trick within five minutes against Maharana Club in the semi-finals. (Note: 27 August 1949, East Bengal 8-0 Maharana Club, Semi Final 1949 IFA Shield, K. P. Dhanraj scored a hat-trick inside the fifth minute of the match. He scored in the first, second and fifth minute of the match.) In the Rovers Cup the scoring continued as East Bengal defeated: Maharashtra XI 3–0 in the first round, Tata Sports 2–0 in the second round, GIP Rail 4–1 in the semi-finals and EI Railways 3–0 in the final where Appa Rao, Venkatesh and Dhanraj each scored as East Bengal lifted the Rovers Cup trophy. The Pancha Pandavas-led East Bengal team scored 111 goals in 35 matches in their very first season.

Their success continued in the following season as East Bengal won the Calcutta League with K. P. Dhanraj winning the top scorer award with 18 goals and the IFA Shield by defeating Services XI 3–0 in the final. The club also won the DCM trophy defeating 8th Gorkha Rifles 2–0 in the final with Venkatesh scoring both goals. In 1951, although the club failed to win the Calcutta League, they completed a hat-trick of IFA Shield wins as they defeated Mohun Bagan 2–0 in the final with P.B.A. Saleh scoring both goals. The team also won their first Durand Cup title as they defeated Rajasthan Club 2–1 in the final with goals from Ahmed Khan and Venkatesh, and became the first Indian team to win the IFA Shield and Durand Cup in the same year. The club received international recognition after winning three back-to-back IFA Shield titles in 1951, as the English FA annual almanac in 1951–52 adjudged East Bengal as the best football team in Asia. In 1952, the Pandavas led East Bengal to another three trophies, as they lifted the Calcutta League with 40 points from 26 matches with K. P. Dhanraj once again bagging the top scorer award with 10 goals. They also won the Delhi-double, first successfully defending the Durand Cup title by defeating Hyderabad Police 1–0 in the final and then defeating 8th Gorkha Rifles 4–0 in the DCM Trophy final, with K. P. Dhanraj scoring a hat-trick and Bhaba Roy scoring the fourth goal for East Bengal.

In 1953, the last year the Pancha Pandavas played together at East Bengal, the Calcutta League was abandoned midway and the club travelled to Bucharest to participate in the World Youth Festival where they finished fourth. Their performance at the tournament earned them an invitation from the Soviet Union, where they played a series of friendly exhibition matches, famously drawing 3–3 against Torpedo Moscow in Moscow, with two goals from Venkatesh and one from M. Thangaraj. The team returned from Europe to participate in the IFA Shield and reached the final where they faced Indian Cultural League. However, after the first two days ending in a stalemate, on the third day East Bengal was scratched from the final after fielding two Pakistani players Masood Fakhri and Niaz Ali, and the Indian Football Association suspended East Bengal from all football activities until 31 December 1954. The club, however, fought a legal battle, and the IFA revoked the suspension later, but this marked the end of the Pancha Pandavas era at East Bengal. In 1954, Venkatesh, Saleh and Dhanraj left the club while Ahmed Khan and Appa Rao remained for a few more years until their retirement—Rao in 1955 and Ahmed Khan in 1959. During the Pancha Pandavas era, East Bengal won 11 major trophies which included three Calcutta Football League titles (1949, 1950, 1952), three back-to-back IFA Shield titles (1949, 1950, 1951), two Durand Cup titles (1951, 1952), one Rovers Cup (1949) and two DCM trophies (1950, 1952). Apart from domestic success, the Pancha Pandavas-led East Bengal team also enjoyed success against international opponents. Post Independence of India, East Bengal's first match against a foreign opponent was on 14 July 1948, when they faced China's Olympic Team at the East Bengal-Mohun Bagan Ground. East Bengal defeated them 2–0 with goals from Appa Rao and Saleh. The Pandavas-led East Bengal won another friendly on 22 November 1951 in Calcutta, against Swedish side FC Gothenburg, by 1–0 with Saleh scoring the game's only goal. Former Indian footballer Chuni Goswami said, "Ahmed Khan was the best among the Pancha Pandavas."

== Europe tour ==
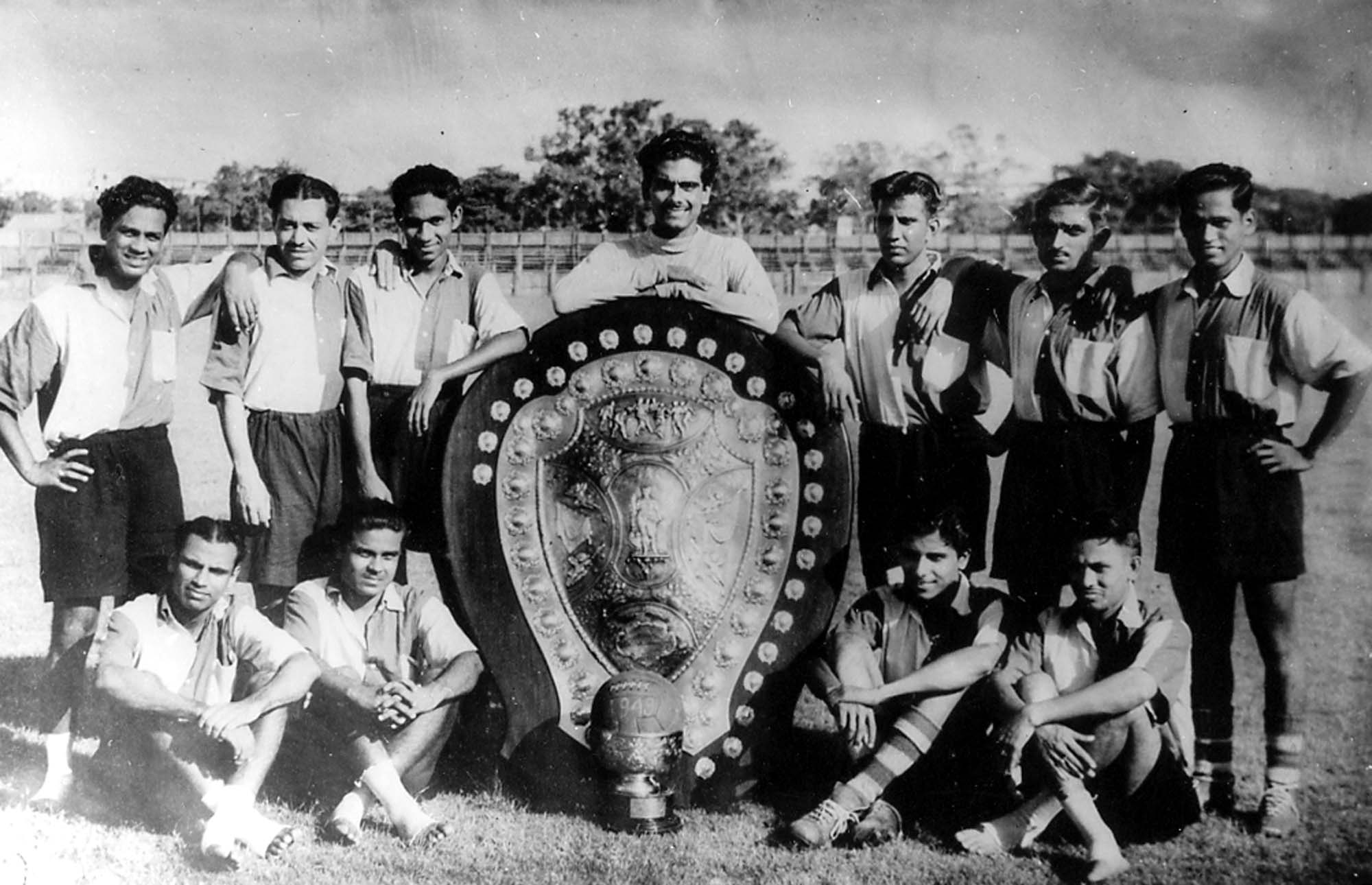
The Pancha Pandavas with the 1950 IFA Shield trophy.

In 1953, the East Bengal team toured Romania and the Soviet Union, the first Indian team to tour Europe. The Calcutta Football League was abandoned midway because of riots in Kolkata. East Bengal management received an invitation to participate in the World Youth Congress to be held at Bucharest, Romania. Captain Ahmed Khan and secretary J.C. Guha led the team on their maiden voyage in Europe. In the first match of the tournament, they defeated the Austrian side Grazer SC 2–0 with both the goals scored by M Thangaraj. In their next game, they defeated Lebanon Club 6–1 with M Thangaraj scoring a hat-trick while Ahmed Khan, P. Venkatesh and Masood Fakhri scored the other three. East Bengal reached the semi-finals where they faced the hosts Romania. The team was defeated 4–0 in the semi-final, and lost again to Germany in the third-place play-offs to finish fourth in the tournament.

Their play at the World Youth Congress earned East Bengal an invitation from the Soviet Union to play a series of friendlies against the top Soviet football teams. East Bengal travelled directly from Bucharest to Moscow and on 21 August 1953, they played their first friendly exhibition game in front of a fully packed Central Dynamo Stadium against Torpedo Moscow. The game ended 3–3 as Venkatesh scored twice and M. Thangaraj scored once for East Bengal as they managed a draw against the 1952 Soviet Cup champions. However, the team was fatigued because of the long tour. The players could not cope with the extreme Russian climate, and the tour took a toll on them as they lost the next three games: 9–1 against Dinamo Tbilisi at Tbilisi, 6–0 against Dynamo Moscow in Moscow and 13–1 against Dynamo Kyiv at Kyiv before the team returned to India.

East Bengal in World Youth Congress
Date	Opponent	Score	Scorers for East Bengal
6 August 1953	(Austria) Grazer AK	2–0	M. Thangaraj (2)
9 August 1953	Lebanon Club	6–0	M. Thangaraj (3); Ahmed Khan; Venkatesh; Fakhri
12 August 1953	Romania	0–4	—
15 August 1953	Germany	2–5	Masood Fakhri; M. Thangaraj

East Bengal in Soviet Union
Date	Opponent	Score	Scorers for East Bengal
21 August 1953	(Soviet Union) Torpedo Moscow	3–3	Venkatesh (2); M. Thangaraj
25 August 1953	(Soviet Union) Dinamo Tbilisi	1–9	M. Thangaraj
1 September 1953	(Soviet Union) Dynamo Moscow	0–6	—
6 September 1953	(Soviet Union) Dynamo Kyiv	1–13	Krishna Kittu

== Statistics ==
The penta-forward attacking lineup that led East Bengal scored 347 goals in five seasons between 1949 and 1953, of which the Pandavas scored 260 goals. K. P. Dhanraj became the second East Bengal player to score 100 goals for the club and surpassed A.C. Somana, who had 102 goals to his name, to become the all-time top scorer for East Bengal with 127 goals. K. P. Dhanraj held the record for almost four decades until he was overtaken by Chima Okorie in the 90s. Venkatesh scored 80 goals for the club, leaving the club as its fourth all-time highest scorer. Ahmed Khan had 63 goals to his name, Appa Rao scored 61 goals while P.B.A. Saleh had 55.

Pancha Pandavas for East Bengal
Name	Goals
K. P. Dhanraj	127
P. Venkatesh	80
Ahmed Khan	63
Appa Rao	61
P.B.A. Saleh	55
Total	386
