= Kiran Khongsai =

Indian footballer

Personal information
- Full name: Lalkhohao Khongsai
- Place of birth: Sadar Hills, Manipur, India
- Position: Striker

Youth career
- Tata Football Academy

Senior career*
Years	Team	Apps	(Gls)
1991–1993	JCT		
1993–1994	East Bengal		
1994–1995	Mohun Bagan		

International career
1991–1993	India	4	(0)
- * Club domestic league appearances and goals

Lalkhohao "Kiran" Khongsai is a former Indian football player from Manipur who played as a forward. Khongsai played for India in the Nehru Cup in 1993.

== Early life ==
Born into a Kuki family, Khongsai hailed from Sadar Hills, now in Kangpokpi district.

== Career ==
Khongsai started his youth career from the Tata Football Academy. He then went on to play for the major Kolkata clubs like East Bengal and Mohun Bagan.

Khongsai along with Gunabir Singh are considered among the pioneers who started playing professional football outside the state, leading to the establishment of Manipur as one of the major state providing abundant talent pool in domestic football.
