= Prasanta Sinha =

Indian footballer

Personal information
- Date of birth: 1938
- Place of birth: Calcutta, Bengal Presidency, British India
- Date of death: 22 September 2015 (aged 77)
- Place of death: Kolkata, West Bengal, India
- Position: Left-half

Senior career*
Years	Team	Apps	(Gls)
- Eastern Railway
1964–1971	East Bengal		

International career
- India
Medal record
Men's football
Representing India
Asian Games
Gold medal – first place	1962 Jakarta	Team
AFC Asian Cup
Runner-up	1964 Israel	Team
- * Club domestic league appearances and goals

Prasanta Sinha was an Indian association football player who represented India internationally, and played club football for East Bengal.

== Playing career ==
He was part of the India national team that finished as runners-up at the 1964 AFC Asian Cup in Israel. He won the gold medal with the Indian team managed by Syed Abdul Rahim, at the 1962 Asian Games football final, defeating South Korea 2–1. In club football, he played for East Bengal FC, where he won Calcutta Football League once and IFA Shield three times. Played as a defender throughout his entire career, Sinha captained the team in 1967–68.

== Death ==
He died in Kolkata at the age of 75 in 2015.

== Honours ==
India

- Asian Games Gold medal: 1962
- AFC Asian Cup runners-up: 1964
- Merdeka Tournament runner-up: 1964; third-place: 1965, 1966

Eastern Railway

- Calcutta Football League: 1958

East Bengal

- IFA Shield: 1970

Individual

- East Bengal "Lifetime Achievement Award": 2012

== See also ==
- List of East Bengal Club captains
