= Krishanu Dey =

Indian footballer (1962–2003)

Personal information
- Date of birth: 14 February 1962
- Place of birth: Calcutta, West Bengal, India
- Date of death: 20 March 2003 (aged 41)
- Place of death: Kolkata, West Bengal, India
- Position: Centre-forward

Senior career*
Years	Team	Apps	(Gls)
1979–1980	Police AC	5	(2)
1980–1982	Calcutta Port Trust	20	(12)
1982–1984	Mohun Bagan		(28)
1984–1991	East Bengal		(37)
1991–1992	Mohun Bagan		(5)
1992–1994	East Bengal		(1)
1995–1997	Food Corporation of India		

International career
1984–1992	India	29	(7)
Medal record
Men's football
Representing India
South Asian Games
Gold medal – first place	1987 Kolkata	Team competition
- * Club domestic league appearances and goals

Krishanu Dey (Bengali: কৃশানু দে; 14 February 1962 – 20 March 2003) was an Indian footballer from Kolkata, India. He was an attacking midfielder and was known as the "Indian Maradona" among his fans due to his footballing skills and playing style.

He started his career with Mohun Bagan.He appeared on Calcutta Football League with club East Bengal from 1984 to 1991 and again from 1992 to 1994, and captained the team in 1989–90. During his playing days, Dey came in touch of Sushil Bhattacharya, East Bengal's first ever head coach.

== Club career ==
Krishanu began his professional career in the Calcutta Football League with Police A.C. in 1979, and groomed under Achyut Banerjee. He later shifted to Calcutta Port Trust in 1980. After spending a couple of seasons there, he joined Mohun Bagan in 1982. He played for Mohun Bagan until 1984. In 1982, he scored a debut goal against Dempo Sports Club in the Strafford Cup. After a series of attempts from Ex-East Bengal recruiter Dipak (Poltu) Das, he joined their arch-rival East Bengal Club in 1985 along with Bikash Panji and became an East Bengal legend. It was during his time in East Bengal, that made him known as the "Indian Maradona".

He was part of the team that won Federation Cup in 1985 and appeared in qualifiers of 1985–86 Asian Club Championship in Saudi Arabia. During his days in mid-1980s, the club was managed by legendary footballer and Olympian P. K. Banerjee. In the Central Asia Zone (tournament named "Coca-Cola Cup"), they beat multiple foreign teams like New Road Team of Nepal, Abahani Krira Chakra of Bangladesh, Club Valencia of the Maldives, and won the Coca Cola Trophy.

He played for East Bengal continuously for a period of 7 years where he won many accolades including a treble (Durand Cup, Rovers Cup, IFA Shield) in 1990. He played for the club under coaching of Syed Nayeemuddin. He returned to Mohun Bagan in 1992, and played alongside Nigerian striker Chima Okorie, one of the best foreigners of the club. Krishanu again returned to East Bengal in 1994 for a season. He later joined his employer side – Food Corporation of India FC in 1995, which was also CFL outfit, having players like Narinder Thapa, Aloke Mukherjee. He played for them until his retirement in 1997. He was one of the highest paid Indian footballers of the eighties and along with his close friend and fellow midfielder Bikash Panji with whom he formed a lethal combination on the field. His club transfer stories throughout the eighties and early nineties are very intriguing where the club dropped down to the level of crime to acquire his signature.

== International career ==
Krishanu made his senior international debut for India on 22 June 1984 in the Great Wall Cup against China. Krishanu represented India in 29 list 'A' matches and scored 7 goals, including a hat-trick at the Merdeka Tournament against Thailand in Malaysia, 1986. He was the fifth Indian and second Bengali after Subhas Bhoumik to score an international hat-trick for India. He took part in Asian Games (1986), Merdeka Cup, Pre-Olympics, SAFF Games and Asian Cup as a member of the Indian team. He was the captain of the Indian team in 1992 Asian Cup qualifiers.

Selected international goals:

FIFA "A" international statistics
Date	Venue	Opponent	Result	Competition	Goals
12 October 1986	Salt Lake Stadium, Calcutta, India	North Yemen	4–0	1984 Asian Cup Qualifier	1
21 March 1985	Senayan Stadium, Jakarta, Indonesia	Indonesia	1–2	1986 World Cup Qualifier	1
9 April 1985	Salt Lake Stadium, Calcutta, India	Thailand	1–1	1986 World Cup Qualifier	1
30 July 1986	Kuala Lumpur, Malaysia	Thailand	3–1	1986 Merdeka	3
21 November 1987	Salt Lake Stadium, Calcutta, India	Maldives	5–0	1987 South Asian Games	1

Non FIFA Statistics:
No.	Date	Venue	Opponent	Result	Competition	Goals
1.	22 July 1986	Kuala Lumpur, Malaysia	Indonesia XI	1–1	1986 Merdeka	1
4.	26 July 1986	Kuala Lumpur, Malaysia	South Korea XI	4–3	1986 Merdeka	2

== Managerial career ==
After his retirement in 1997, Dey went on to choose a managerial career and coached Food Corporation of India FC. He later managed Calcutta Football League outfit Kalighat Club in the 2000s.

== Personal life ==
He lived in Naktala, a south Kolkata neighbourhood. In his childhood, Krishanu used to play cricket and hated playing football as it is a more physical game. After realising his talent in football he started taking the sport more seriously. He married a girl from Naktala on 8 February 1988 and on 25 December 1990, he and his wife had a son. He died on 20 March 2003, following a pulmonary disorder and multi-organ failure in a city hospital. He is survived by his wife Sharmila 'Poni' Dey and a son Soham Dey, who is sports journalist in a leading newspaper in Kolkata. He has a Statue in his honor near Patuli Area in Kolkata. The Indian Football Association has named their under-19 football league in his memory.

== In popular culture ==
A web series based on Dey, named Krishanu Krishanu, was released on 29 August 2019 on ZEE5, starring Anirban Chakrabarti, Elena Kazan, Badshah Moitra.

== Legacy ==
At the 123rd edition of the prestigious IFA Shield, top scorer of the tournament award was renamed as 'Krishanu Dey Memorial Award' in honour of Dey.

In 2023, East Bengal built a luxurious VVIP lounge at the East Bengal Ground and named it after Krishanu Dey.

== Honours ==
Mohun Bagan

- Federation Cup: 1982
- Durand Cup: 1982, 1984
- IFA Shield: 1982
- Calcutta Football League: 1983, 1984

East Bengal

- Federation Cup: 1985
- IFA Shield: 1984, 1986, 1990, 1991, 1994
- Durand Cup: 1989, 1990, 1991, 1993
- Calcutta Football League: 1985, 1987, 1988, 1989, 1991, 1993
- Rovers Cup: 1990, 1994
- Coca Cola Cup: 1985
- Bordoloi Trophy: 1992
- All Airlines Gold Cup: 1987, 1988, 1990, 1992
- Darjeeling Gold Cup: 1985
- SSS Trophy: 1989, 1991
- Sait Nagjee Trophy: 1986
- Stafford Cup: 1986

Bengal

- Santosh Trophy: 1986–87

India

- South Asian Games Gold medal: 1985, 1987

== See also ==
- List of India national football team captains
- List of East Bengal Club captains

== Bibliography ==
- Kapadia, Novy (2017). Barefoot to Boots: The Many Lives of Indian Football. Penguin Random House. ISBN 978-0-143-42641-7.
- Martinez, Dolores; Mukharjiim, Projit B (2009). Football: From England to the World: The Many Lives of Indian Football. Routledge. ISBN 978-1-138-88353-6. Archived from the original on 2 July 2022.
- Nath, Nirmal (2011). History of Indian Football: Upto 2009–10. Readers Service. ISBN 9788187891963. Archived from the original on 22 July 2022.
- Dineo, Paul; Mills, James (2001). Soccer in South Asia: Empire, Nation, Diaspora. London, United Kingdom: Frank Cass Publishers. ISBN 978-0-7146-8170-2. Archived from the original on 25 July 2022.
- "Triumphs and Disasters: The Story of Indian Football, 1889—2000" (PDF). Archived from the original (PDF) on 13 August 2012.
- Mukhopadhay, Subir (2018). সোনায় লেখা ইতিহাসে মোহনবাগান (transl. Mohun Bagan in the history written in gold). ISBN 978-93-850172-0-9.
- Banerjee, Argha; Basu, Rupak (2022). মোহনবাগান: সবুজ ঘাসের মেরুন গল্প (transl. Mohun Bagan: Green fields' Maroon stories). Shalidhan. ISBN 978-81-954667-0-2.
- Roy, Gautam (1 January 2021). East Bengal 100. Allsport Foundation. ISBN 978-8194763109.
- Majumdar, Boria; Bandyopadhyay, Kausik (2006). A Social History Of Indian Football: Striving To Score. Routledge. ISBN 9780415348355. Archived from the original on 29 June 2021.
- Basu, Jaydeep (2003). Stories from Indian Football. UBS Publishers' Distributors. ISBN 9788174764546. Archived from the original on 11 October 2022.
- Chattopadhyay, Hariprasad (2017). Mohun Bagan–East Bengal (in Bengali). Kolkata: Parul Prakashan.
