= Byomkesh Bose =

Indian footballer

Personal information
- Date of birth: 1927
- Place of birth: Calcutta, Bengal Presidency, British India
- Date of death: 4 October 2003 (aged 75–76)
- Place of death: Kolkata, West Bengal, India
- Position: Defender

Senior career*
Years	Team	Apps	(Gls)
1948–1953	East Bengal		
1956	East Bengal		
1959	East Bengal		

International career
- India
- * Club domestic league appearances and goals

Byomkesh Bose (1927 – 4 October 2003) was an Indian association football player. He was part of the team that played at the football competition in the 1952 Summer Olympics, but he did not play in any matches. He died in 2003.

== Playing career ==
Bose appeared with East Bengal from 1948 to 1958 and captained the team in 1951. He represented Syed Abdul Rahim managed India at the 1952 Summer Olympics.

== Honours ==
East Bengal

- IFA Shield: 1949, 1951, 1953
- Durand Cup: 1953
