= Pansanttom Venkatesh =

Indian footballer

P. Venkatesh
Personal information
- Date of birth: 8 September 1926
- Place of birth: Bangalore, Mysore State, British India
- Date of death: 1 June 1977 (aged 50–51)
- Place of death: Calcutta, West Bengal, India
- Position: Forward

Senior career*
Years	Team	Apps	(Gls)
	East Bengal	50+	(81)

International career
- India
Medal record
Men's football
Representing India
Asian Games
Gold medal – first place	1951 New Delhi	Team
- * Club domestic league appearances and goals

Pansanttom Venkatesh (1926 – 1 June 1977) was an Indian footballer. Venkatesh played for East Bengal and the India national football team during his professional career.

== Club career ==
Venkatesh spent most of his club career in East Bengal, and captained the team in 1952–53. He was part of the team that played against German side Kickers Offenbach and FC Torpedo Moscow in 1953. He also scored two goals against Torpedo in their 3–3 draw at the Central Dynamo Stadium. With East Bengal from 1948 to 1953, he scored overall 81 goals, and emerged as top scorer in 1953.

In the same year, he represented the club at the World Youth Festival in Romania. He scored a goal against Lebanon XI in their 6–1 win.

== International career ==
Venkatesh was part of the prominent national team during the "golden era" of Indian football, managed by Syed Abdul Rahim, became one of the best teams in Asia. He represented India and won gold-medal at the 1951 Asian Games, held in New Delhi. He also went on the play at the 1952 Summer Olympics with India.

He was also a part of Balaidas Chatterjee managed Indian team that participated in 1953 Asian Quadrangular Football Tournament in Rangoon, and won the title. He also won the 1954 edition. Venkatesh also appeared with the Indian team in an exhibition match in December 1954 in an 1–0 defeat to Allsvenskan club AIK at CC&FC Ground in Kolkata.

== Honours ==
East Bengal

- IFA Shield: 1949, 1950, 1951

Mysore

- Santosh Trophy: 1946–47

Bengal

- Santosh Trophy: 1950-51

India

- Asian Games Gold medal: 1951
- Asian Quadrangular Football Tournament: 1952, 1953, 1954

== See also ==
- List of East Bengal Club captains

== Bibliography ==
- Kapadia, Novy (2017). Barefoot to Boots: The Many Lives of Indian Football. Penguin Random House. ISBN 978-0-143-42641-7.
- Dineo, Paul; Mills, James (2001). Soccer in South Asia: Empire, Nation, Diaspora. London, United Kingdom: Frank Cass Publishers. p. 33. ISBN 978-0-7146-8170-2. Archived from the original on 25 July 2022.
- Majumdar, Boria, Bandyopadhyay, Kausik (2006). Goalless: The Story of a Unique Footballing Nation. Penguin India. ISBN 9780670058747.
- Martinez, Dolores; Mukharjiim, Projit B (2009). Football: From England to the World: The Many Lives of Indian Football. Routledge. ISBN 978-1-138-88353-6. Archived from the original on 2 July 2022.
- Nath, Nirmal (2011). History of Indian Football: Upto 2009–10. Readers Service. ISBN 9788187891963. Archived from the original on 22 July 2022.
- "Triumphs and Disasters: The Story of Indian Football, 1889—2000" (PDF). Archived from the original (PDF) on 13 August 2012.
- Roy, Gautam (1 January 2021). East Bengal 100. Allsport Foundation. ISBN 978-8194763109.
- Chattopadhyay, Hariprasad (2017). Mohun Bagan–East Bengal (in Bengali). Kolkata: Parul Prakashan.
- Majumdar, Boria; Bandyopadhyay, Kausik (2006). A Social History Of Indian Football: Striving To Score. Routledge. ISBN 9780415348355. Archived from the original on 29 June 2021.
- Basu, Jaydeep (2003). Stories from Indian Football. UBS Publishers' Distributors. ISBN 9788174764546. Archived from the original on 11 October 2022.
