= Chandan Singh Rawat =

Indian footballer (1928–2008)

Personal information
- Date of birth: 26 July 1928
- Place of birth: Darjeeling, British India
- Date of death: 24 July 2008 (aged 79)
- Place of death: Siliguri, West Bengal, India

Senior career*
Years	Team	Apps	(Gls)
- East Bengal
- Mohun Bagan
- Rajasthan Club

International career
- India
Medal record
Men's football
Representing India
Asian Games
Gold medal – first place	1951 New Delhi	Team
- * Club domestic league appearances and goals

Chandan Singh Rawat (26 July 1928 – 24 July 2008) was an Indian footballer. He competed in the men's tournament at the 1952 Summer Olympics.

== Honours ==
East Bengal

- IFA Shield: 1951

India

- Asian Games Gold medal: 1951
- Asian Quadrangular Football Tournament: 1953, 1954
