= Runu Guha Thakurta =

Indian footballer

Personal information
- Place of birth: Jalpaiguri, British India
- Position: Forward

Senior career*
Years	Team	Apps	(Gls)
- George Telegraph
- Mohun Bagan

International career
- India
Medal record
Men's football
Representing India
Asian Games
Gold medal – first place	1951 New Delhi	Team
- * Club domestic league appearances and goals

Runu Guha Thakurta was a former Indian association football player. He was part of the squad that played at the 1952 Summer Olympics against Yugoslavia, but he did not play in the match. He played for both the Calcutta Football League side George Telegraph SC, and Mohun Bagan AC.

== Honours ==
India

- Asian Games Gold medal: 1951
- Asian Quadrangular Football Tournament: 1952

Bengal

- Santosh Trophy: 1950-51

Mohun Bagan

- Durand Cup: 1953
