= K. P. Dhanraj =

Indian footballer

Personal information
- Full name: Kadirvelu Punerangam Dhanraj
- Date of birth: 2 May 1925
- Place of birth: Ooty
- Date of death: 26 April 1997
- Place of death: Hyderabad, Andhra Pradesh (now Telangana), India
- Position: Forward

Senior career*
Years	Team	Apps	(Gls)
- GEF Sport Club
1949–1953	East Bengal		
1957–1959	East Bengal		

International career
- India
- * Club domestic league appearances and goals

K.P. Dhanraj (2 May 1925 – 26 April 1997) was an Indian association football player, one of the member of iconic "Pancha Pandavas" of East Bengal Club.

== Playing career ==
He was part of the team that played against France at the 1948 Summer Olympics where India lost the match 1–2. He appeared with East Bengal from 1949 to 1953 and again from 1957 to 1959, and captained the team in 1953–54.

== Honours ==
East Bengal

- IFA Shield: 1949, 1950, 1951, 1958
- Calcutta Football League: 1950

Mysore

- Santosh Trophy: 1946–47

Individual

- Calcutta Football League top scorer: 1950 (with 18 goals)
