= Gautam Sarkar =

Indian Bengali footballer and coach

Gautam Sarkar, also spelt as Goutam Sarkar, and known by the nickname "Indian Beckenbauer" (born 8 January 1950), is a former Indian Bengali international footballer and football coach from West Bengal. He completed his schooling from Baranagore Ramakrishna Mission Ashrama High School. He played for East Bengal Club and captained the team in 1976–77. Sarkar began his club football career in Kidderpore SC, and also played for Aryans. He was awarded Banga Bhushan by the Government of West Bengal in 2014.

== Honours ==
East Bengal

- IFA Shield: 1974, 1975

Mohun Bagan

- Federation Cup: 1978–79, 1980–81

Individual

- Mohun Bagan Ratna: 2023

== See also ==
- Banga Bhushan
- List of SC East Bengal captains
