= P. B. A. Saleh =

Indian footballer

Personal information
- Full name: P. B. Abdul Saleh
- Date of birth: 28 November 1928
- Place of birth: Kottayam, India
- Date of death: 24 June 1979 (aged 50)
- Position: Forward

Senior career*
Years	Team	Apps	(Gls)
1945–1953	East Bengal		(55)
- Calcutta Customs

International career
- India
Medal record
Men's football
Representing India
Asian Games
Gold medal – first place	1951 New Delhi	Team
- * Club domestic league appearances and goals

Puthanparambil Babakhan Abdul Razzaq Saleh (28 November 1928 – 24 June 1979), nicknamed Kottayam Saleh, was an Indian football player. He was part of the team that played against Yugoslavia in a 10–1 defeat at the 1952 Summer Olympics.

== Playing career ==
Saleh, who played on the left wing, came from Kerala and played nine seasons for East Bengal, and captained the team in 1950–51. He represented India internationally under coaching of Syed Abdul Rahim.

== Personal life ==
Saleh worked in the Geological Survey of India and later as a senior superintendent in Customs. He died in 1979 from a heart attack during a train journey.

== Honours ==
East Bengal

- IFA Shield: 1949, 1950, 1951

Bengal

- Santosh Trophy: 1947-48, 1950-51

India

- Asian Games Gold medal: 1951

== See also ==
- Pancha Pandavas
