= 4th World Festival of Youth and Students =

1953 festival in Bucharest, Romania

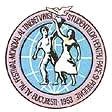
- Host country: Romanian People's Republic
- Dates: 2 – 14 August 1953
- Motto: No! Our generation will not serve death and destruction!
- Cities: Bucharest
- Participants: 30,000 people from 111 countries
- Follows: 5th World Festival of Youth and Students
- Precedes: 3rd World Festival of Youth and Students

The 4th World Festival of Youth and Students (WFYS) was held from 2 to 16 August 1953 in Bucharest, capital city of the then Romanian People's Republic.

== Organisation and events ==
The World Federation of Democratic Youth organized this festival against a background of what it described as persecution of communists, such as in West Germany, where Philipp Müller, a delegate to the 3rd WFYS had been killed during a demonstration, and in the United States, where Julius and Ethel Rosenberg had been convicted of espionage on behalf of the Soviet Union, and executed. Other stated goals of the festival were to protest against the Korean War and to support the anti-colonial movements in the French colonies of Algeria and Vietnam. With this background, the festival and its preparation became anti-war demonstrations.

It was held 2–16 August 1953, at the newly built 23 August Stadium. More than 30,000 young people from 111 countries participated in the Festival.

The motto of the festival was No! Our generation will not serve death and destruction!.

The festival's sports programme featured an athletics competition, as well as dance performances.
