= 1964 AFC Asian Cup squads =

Squads in international football tournament

Squads for the 1964 AFC Asian Cup played in Israel.

== Israel ==
Head coach: (Israel) Yosef Merimovich

| No. | Pos. | Player | Date of birth (age) | Caps | Goals | Club |
|---|---|---|---|---|---|---|
| | GK | Haim Levin | 3 March 1937 (aged 27) | 1 | 0 | (Israel Football Association) Maccabi Tel Aviv |
| | GK | Itzhak Vissoker | 18 September 1944 (aged 19) | 4 | 0 | (Israel Football Association) Hapoel Petah Tikva |
| | DF | Avraham Kalmi | 10 December 1939 (aged 24) | 1 | 0 | (Israel Football Association) Maccabi Jaffa |
| | DF | David Primo | 5 May 1946 (aged 18) | 2 | 0 | (Israel Football Association) Hapoel Tel Aviv |
| | DF | Haim Bahar | 10 April 1943 (aged 21) | 0 | 0 | (Israel Football Association) Hapoel Petah Tikva |
| | DF | Moshe Leon | 9 January 1944 (aged 20) | 7 | 0 | (Israel Football Association) Maccabi Jaffa |
| | DF | Shaul Matania | 8 March 1937 (aged 19) | 17 | 0 | (Israel Football Association) Maccabi Tel Aviv |
| | MF | Amatzia Levkovich | 27 December 1937 (aged 18) | 36 | 1 | (Israel Football Association) Hapoel Tel Aviv |
| | MF | Gideon Tish | 13 October 1939 (aged 16) | 34 | 0 | (Israel Football Association) Hapoel Tel Aviv |
| | MF | Mordechai Spiegler | 19 August 1944 (aged 19) | 4 | 1 | (Israel Football Association) Maccabi Netanya |
| | MF | Nahum Stelmach | 19 July 1936 (aged 27) | 45 | 20 | (Israel Football Association) Hapoel Petah Tikva |
| | MF | Yehezkel Katsav | 1945 (aged 19) | 0 | 0 | (Israel Football Association) Maccabi Jaffa |
| | MF | Yosef Mahalal | 25 December 1939 (aged 24) | 4 | 2 | (Israel Football Association) Bnei Yehuda |
| | FW | Einstein Kalish | 8 December 1939 (aged 24) | 2 | 0 | (Israel Football Association) Maccabi Jaffa |
| | FW | Rahamim Talbi | 17 May 1943 (aged 21) | 0 | 0 | (Israel Football Association) Maccabi Tel Aviv |
| | FW | Roby Young | 15 May 1942 (aged 22) | 13 | 2 | (Israel Football Association) Hapoel Haifa |
| | FW | Shlomo Levi | 1 June 1934 (aged 29) | 11 | 6 | (Israel Football Association) Hapoel Ramat Gan |
| | FW | Yohai Aharoni | 8 June 1943 (aged 20) | 0 | 0 | (Israel Football Association) Hapoel Mahane Yehuda |

== India ==
Head coach: (England) Harry Wright

| No. | Pos. | Player | Date of birth (age) | Caps | Goals | Club |
|---|---|---|---|---|---|---|
| | GK | Peter Thangaraj | 24 December 1935 (aged 28) | | | (All India Football Federation) Mohun Bagan |
| | GK | S. S. Narayan | 12 November 1934 (aged 29) | | | (All India Football Federation) Tata Sports Club |
| | DF | O. Chandrashekar | 10 July 1935 (aged 28) | | | (All India Football Federation) Maharashtra |
| | DF | Arun Ghosh | 7 July 1941 (aged 22) | | | (All India Football Federation) Railways |
| | DF | Mritunjoy Banerjee | | | | (All India Football Federation) Bengal |
| | DF | Syed Nayeemuddin | | | | (All India Football Federation) Andhra Pradesh |
| | DF | Jarnail Singh | 20 February 1936 (aged 28) | | | (All India Football Federation) Mohun Bagan |
| | MF | Prasanta Sinha | | | | (All India Football Federation) Bengal |
| | MF | Fortunato Franco | | | | (All India Football Federation) Maharashtra |
| | MF | Ram Bahadur Chettri | 15 February 1937 (aged 27) | | | (All India Football Federation) East Bengal |
| | MF | Kajal Mukherjee | | | | (All India Football Federation) Railways |
| | MF | Inder Singh | 23 December 1943 (aged 20) | | | (All India Football Federation) Leaders Club Jalandhar |
| | FW | Yousuf Khan | 5 August 1937 (aged 26) | | | (All India Football Federation) Hyderabad City Police |
| | FW | Chuni Goswami (c) | 19 January 1938 (aged 26) | | | (All India Football Federation) Bengal |
| | FW | K. Appalaraju | | | | (All India Football Federation) Bengal Nagpur Railway |
| | FW | Arumainayagam | | | | (All India Football Federation) Mohun Bagan |
| | FW | H. H. Hamid | 11 March 1942 (aged 22) | | | (All India Football Federation) Bengal |
| | FW | Sukumar Samajpati | | | | (All India Football Federation) East Bengal |
| | FW | P. K. Banerjee | 23 June 1936 (aged 27) | | | (All India Football Federation) Bengal |

== Hong Kong ==
Head coach: (Taiwan) (Hong Kong) Fei Chun Wah (費春華)

| No. | Pos. | Player | Date of birth (age) | Caps | Goals | Club |
|---|---|---|---|---|---|---|
| | GK | Lo Tak Kuen (盧德權) | 1940 (aged 23–24) | | | (Hong Kong) Kitchee |
| | DF | Lok Tak Hing (駱德興) | | | | (Hong Kong) Happy Valley |
| | DF | Ip Kam Hung (葉錦洪) | | | | (Hong Kong) Sing Tao |
| | DF | Fung Kee Wan (馮紀魂) | | | | (Hong Kong) Jardine |
| | DF | Liu Kam Ming (廖錦明) | | | | (Hong Kong) Tuen Mun SA |
| | MF | Ho Cheung Yau (何祥友) | 1933 (aged 30–31) | | | (Hong Kong) South China |
| | MF | Cheung Wing Ching (張永清) | | | | (Hong Kong) Rangers |
| | MF | Cheung Yiu Kwok (張耀國) | | | | (Hong Kong) Tuen Mun SA |
| | FW | Au Pan Nin (區彭年) | | | | (Hong Kong) Happy Valley |
| | FW | Kwok Wing (郭榮) | | | | (Hong Kong) Royal Air Force |
| | FW | Leung Wai Hung (梁偉雄) | | | | (Hong Kong) Rangers |
| | GK | Mok Siu Lam (莫小霖) | | | | (Hong Kong) Royal Air Force |
| | DF | Leung Kit (梁杰) | | | | (Hong Kong) Jardine |
| | MF | Kung Wah Kit (龔華傑) | | | | (Hong Kong) Tuen Mun FC |
| | MF | Lau Chi Lam (劉志霖) | | | | (Hong Kong) Eastern |
| | FW | Lee Kwok Keung (李國強) | | | | (Hong Kong) Happy Valley |
| | FW | Lau Kai Chiu (劉繼照) | | | | (Hong Kong) Kitchee |

== South Korea ==
The Korea Football Association sent the B team, as the main players played in the Summer Olympics qualification around the same time frame.

Head coach: Park Il-kap

| No. | Pos. | Player | Date of birth (age) | Caps | Goals | Club |
|---|---|---|---|---|---|---|
| | GK | Yang Woo-sik | | | | (Korea Football Association) Kyung Hee University |
| | DF | Kim Jung-suk | | | | (Korea Football Association) Korea University |
| | DF | Park Seung-ok | 28 January 1938 (aged 26) | | | (Korea Football Association) Korea Tungsten |
| | MF | Kim Young-yeol | | | | (Korea Football Association) Korean National Railroad |
| | DF | Seo Sung-oh | | | | (Korea Football Association) Hongik University |
| | DF | Cho Nam-soo | | | | (Korea Football Association) ROK Marine Corps |
| | MF | Choi Myung-gon | | | | (Korea Football Association) ROK Marine Corps |
| | MF | Lee Soon-myung | 23 June 1939 (aged 24) | | | (Korea Football Association) Yonsei University |
| | FW | Jang Seok-woo | | | | (Korea Football Association) Hongik University |
| | FW | Huh Yoon-jung | | | | (Korea Football Association) Korea Coal Corporation |
| | FW | Chung Soon-chun | 15 January 1940 (aged 24) | | | (Korea Football Association) ROK Marine Corps |
| | GK | Oh In-bok | | | | (Korea Football Association) Hanyang University |
| | DF | Lee Eun-sung | | | | (Korea Football Association) Hongik University |
| | MF | Kim Doo-seon | | | | (Korea Football Association) Korean National Railroad |
| | FW | Jung Byung-tak | | | | (Korea Football Association) Yonsei University |
| | FW | Jang Ji-un | | | | (Korea Football Association) Hanyang University |
| | MF | Bae Geum-soo | | | | (Korea Football Association) Kyung Hee University |
