= 1965 IFA Shield final =

- Event: 1965 IFA Shield
Mohun Bagan	East Bengal
- East Bengal won the final after a replay

Final
Mohun Bagan	East Bengal
0	0
- Date: 22 September 1965
- Venue: Mohun Bagan Ground, Kolkata, West Bengal
- Referee: Sailen Bhattacharya
- Attendance: 30,000 (estd.)

Replay
Mohun Bagan	East Bengal
0	1
- Date: 16 October 1965
- Venue: Mohun Bagan Ground, Kolkata, West Bengal
- Referee: Sailen Bhattacharya
- Attendance: 30,000 (estd.)

The 1965 IFA Shield final was the 64th final of the IFA Shield, the second oldest football competition in India, and was contested between Kolkata giants East Bengal and Mohun Bagan on 22 September 1965 first which ended in a draw and then a replay on 16 October 1965 at the Mohun Bagan Ground in Kolkata.

East Bengal won the replayed final 1–0 to claim their 8th IFA Shield title. Ashim Moulik scored the only goal in the replay final as East Bengal lifted their eighth IFA Shield title.

== Route to the final ==
Mohun Bagan		Round	East Bengal	
Opponent	Result	Round	Opponent	Result
Wari	1–0	Third Round	Burdwan District XI	6–0
Eastern Railway	0–0; w/o	Quarter–Final	Hyderabad XI	2–1
Bangalore XI	5–0	Semi–Final	Bengal Nagpur Railway	2–0

== Match ==
=== Summary ===
The IFA Shield final began at the Mohun Bagan Ground in Kolkata on 22 September 1965 in front of a packed crowd as Kolkata giants East Bengal and Mohun Bagan faced each other in a Kolkata Derby. Mohun Bagan made their seventeenth appearance in the final after they defeated Bangalore XI 5–0 in the semi-final, having won it nine times previously in 1911, 1947, 1948, 1952, 1954, 1956, 1960, 1961, and 1962. East Bengal reached their thirteenth final after defeating Bengal Nagpur Railway 2–0 in the semi-final, having won the title seven times previously in 1943, 1945, 1949, 1950, 1951, 1958, and 1961.

Both Mohun Bagan and East Bengal tried to dominate the game from the first minute but cancelled each other out. The goalkeepers Pradyut Barman and Peter Thangaraj were the stars of the game as both of them made some terrific saves as the game ended in a goalless draw. The committee decided to host the final in a later date.

=== Details ===
22 September 1965
15:00 IST

Mohun Bagan	0–0	East Bengal

Mohun Bagan Ground, Kolkata
Attendance: 30,000 (est.)
Referee: Sailen Bhattacharya

Mohun Bagan	East Bengal

GK	(India) Pradyut Barman
DF	(India) Bikramjit Debnath
DF	(India) Jarnail SIngh
DF	(India) T. Abdul Rahman
MF	(India) Bidyut Mazumdar
MF	(India) Bimal Chakraborty
FW	(India) Kajal Mukherjee
FW	(India) Amal Chakraborty
FW	(India) Ashok Chatterjee
FW	(India) Chuni Goswami (c)
FW	(India) Arumainayagam
Substitutes:
—

GK
DF
DF
DF
MF
MF
FW
FW
FW
FW
FW
Substitutes:
FW

(India) Peter Thangaraj
(India) Shanto Mitra
(India) Chandreshwar Prasad
(India) Sushil Sinha
(India) Srikanta Banerjee
(India) Prasanta Sinha
(India) Sukumar Samajpati (c)
(India) Parimal Dey
(India) Ashim Moulik
(India) Satish Das	Substituted off
(India) Sambhu Das Chowdhury
(India) Sujato	Substituted in

Match rules

- 70 minutes.
- Replay if scores still level.

== Replay ==
=== Summary ===
The replay final began at the Mohun Bagan Ground in Kolkata on 16 October 1965 after the first game ended in a 0–0 stalemate.

East Bengal and Mohun Bagan both tried to dominate the game once again from the first minute with both the teams creating multiple chances but failed to break the deadlock. Kajal Mukherjee got the best chance for Mohun Bagan in the first half but he missed an open net as the game remained goalless at halftime. The match slowed down in the second half and was almost going to end in another goalless tie, when Ashim Moulik received the ball from Parimal Dey in the very last minute of the game and scored with a powerful long range effort to make it 1–0 for East Bengal as they lifted their eighth IFA Shield title.

=== Details ===
16 October 1965
15:00 IST

Mohun Bagan	0–1	East Bengal
		Moulik 69'

Mohun Bagan Ground, Kolkata
Attendance: 30,000 (est.)
Referee: Sailen Bhattacharya

Mohun Bagan	East Bengal

GK	(India) Pradyut Barman
DF	(India) Bikramjit Debnath
DF	(India) Jarnail SIngh
DF	(India) T. Abdul Rahman
MF	(India) Bidyut Mazumdar
MF	(India) Bimal Chakraborty
FW	(India) Kajal Mukherjee	Substituted off
FW	(India) Amal Chakraborty
FW	(India) Ashok Chatterjee
FW	(India) Chuni Goswami (c)
FW	(India) Arumainayagam
Substitutes:
FW	(India) Dulal Mondal	Substituted in

GK	(India) Peter Thangaraj
DF	(India) Shanto Mitra
DF	(India) Chandreshwar Prasad
DF	(India) Sushil Sinha	Substituted off
MF	(India) Ram Bahadur Chettri
MF	(India) Prasanta Sinha
FW	(India) Sukumar Samajpati (c)
FW	(India) Sujato
FW	(India) Ashim Moulik
FW	(India) Parimal Dey
FW	(India) Sambhu Das Chowdhury
Substitutes:
FW	(India) S. Thomas	Substituted in

Match rules

- 70 minutes.
- 15 minutes of extra time if game ends in a draw.
- Joint winners if game ends in a draw after extra time.
