= Maidaan =

2024 Indian film by Amit Sharma

- Theatrical release poster
- Directed by: Amit Sharma
- Screenplay by: Saiwyn Quadras; Aman Rai; Atul Shahi; Amit Sharma
- Dialogues by: Ritesh Shah; Siddhant Mago
- Story by: Saiwyn Quadras; Akash Chawla; Arunava Joy Sengupta
- Produced by: Zee Studios; Fresh Lime Films; Akash Chawla; Arunava Joy Sengupta; Boney Kapoor
- Starring: Ajay Devgn; Priyamani; Gajraj Rao
- Cinematography: Tushar Kanti Ray; Fyodor Lyass (sports)
- Edited by: Dev Rao Jadhav; Shahnawaz Mosani (sports)
- Music by: A. R. Rahman
- Production companies: Zee Studios; Bayview Projects; Fresh Lime Films
- Distributed by: Zee Studios
- Release date: 10 April 2024
- Running time: 181 minutes
- Country: India
- Language: Hindi
- Budget: ₹235 crore
- Box office: est. ₹68.09 crore

Maidaan (transl. Field) is a 2024 Indian Hindi-language biographical sports drama film co-written and directed by Amit Ravindernath Sharma and produced by Akash Chawla, Arunava Joy Sengupta, Boney Kapoor and Zee Studios. The film stars Ajay Devgn as Syed Abdul Rahim, a pioneering football coach in India between 1952 and 1962. The music is composed by A. R. Rahman.

The film was released worldwide on 11 April 2024, coinciding with Eid. It received positive reviews from critics but emerged as a commercial failure, grossing ₹68 crore worldwide.

Maidaan received 13 nominations at the 70th Filmfare Awards including Best Actor (Devgn), Best Film (Critics) and Best Cinematography.

== Plot ==
At the 1952 Summer Olympics in Helsinki, the Indian national football team faces a major defeat against Yugoslavia with a score of 10-1. The members of this All India Football Federation blame the coach Syed Abdul Rahim for the team's underperformance. Rahim requests permission to form another team with new players. The members of the federation are reluctant, especially Subhankar, but Rahim receives support from President Anjan, who grants him permission. Rahim then scouts for players from all over India and forms a new team consisting of Tulsidas Balaram from Secunderabad, Peter Thangaraj from Hyderabad, and P. K. Banerjee and Chuni Goswami from Calcutta among others. Roy Choudhary, an influential journalist from Calcutta, holds a grudge against Rahim, as he has formed the team with a very small number of players from Calcutta.

At the 1956 Summer Olympics in Melbourne, the Indian team prepares to play against Australia. A player from the Australian team disrespects Neville D'Souza and makes him tie his shoes. Neville goes on to score a hat-trick and the Indian team wins the match with a score of 7-1, leaving the Australian team in shock. The Indian team eventually secures the fourth position at the Olympics. Meanwhile, Roy Choudhary and Subhankar plan to remove Rahim from the federation and make Subhankar the President. At the 1960 Summer Olympics the Indian team is pitted against France, which is considered the best team in the world. The match ended in a draw with a score of 1-1, and the Indian team fails to qualify. The federation removes Rahim as coach for the Indian team on the grounds of underperformance. Rahim also learns that he has developed lung cancer due to his excessive smoking habit and will not live long.

Rahim decides to spend his remaining days at home with his family and has frequent coughing fits. His wife, Saira, motivates him, telling him not to give up and pursue his dream of leading the Indian team to win a gold medal. Rahim requests that the federation let him coach the team again and promises that if the team does not win a gold medal, he will not coach any team again in his life. Subhankar, who is now President, initially refuses but has to give in to his request as the other members of the federation give their votes to let Rahim coach the team.

Rahim begins to coach the team again and prepares them for the 1962 Asian Games in Jakarta. However, the Finance Ministry refuses to let the Indian team participate in the competition, citing insufficient funds. Rahim personally speaks with the Finance Minister Morarji Desai and convinces him with the condition that only 16 players will be allowed to go for the competition. Rahim leaves out the rest, including his son Hakim.

In Jakarta, Thangaraj, the team's goalkeeper, is injured before their first match and is replaced by Pradyut Barman, which weakens the team. In their first match, the Indian team face defeat against South Korea, with the teammates blaming one another. After the match, Rahim makes them understand the importance of formation and coordination. In their next match against Thailand, Jarnail Singh, is gravely injured by an opponent. Rahim instructs the Indian team "to make them pay for it" and they go on to play more aggressively, winning the match with a score of 4-1. An Indian diplomat publicly criticises the decision of not allowing Israel and Taiwan to play in the competition, which angers the people of Indonesia, leading to massive public protests against the Indian team.

On the day of the final match, where the Indian team would play against South Korea, the team bus is attacked by protesters, and the military is brought in to provide security for them. Rahim's health deteriorates, and he begins coughing up blood, but still motivates the team by delivering an inspiring speech. On seeing Rahim's determination, Roy Choudhary has a change of heart and starts supporting the Indian team. Thangaraj and Singh also rejoin the team for the match. The Indian team goes on to win the match with a score of 2-1, winning the only gold medal in Football at the Asian Games.

== Cast ==
- Ajay Devgn as Syed Abdul Rahim alias Rahim Saab
- Priyamani as Saira Rahim
- Gajraj Rao as Roy Chaudhary
- Devyansh Tripathi as Syed Shahid Hakim, Rahim's son
- Rishab Joshi as S. S. Hakim
- Nitanshi Goel as Rahim's daughter
- Aayesha Vindhara as Rahim's daughter
- Meenal Patel as Rahim's mother
- Rudranil Ghosh as Shubhankar (based on Manindra Nath Dutta Ray)
- Baharul Islam as Anjan based on Pankaj Gupta
- Zaheer Mirza as Morarji Desai
- Madhur Mittal as Fortunato Franco
- Chaitanya Sharma as PK Banerjee
- Aryann Bhowmik as Neville D'Souza
- Tejas Ravishankar as Peter Thangaraj
- Davinder Gill as Jarnail Singh
- Amartya Ray as Chuni Goswami
- Sushant Waydande as Tulsidas Balaram
- Abhilash Thapliyal as Indian Commentator Dev Matthew
- Manandeep Singh as Trilok Singh Basera
- Vishnu G Varrier as O. Chandrashekar
- Raphael Jose as D. Ethiraj
- Jayanth V. as Arumainayagam
- Aaman Munshi as Arun Ghosh
- Sai Kishore as DMK Afzal
- Amandeep Thakur as Ram Bahadur Chettri
- Tanmay Bhattacharjee as Pradyut Barman
- Arko Das as Prasanta Sinha
- Prajwal Maski as Yousuf Khan
- Vijay Maurya as Indian Commentator Ramesh Sagar
- Anupam Joardar as Bidhan Chandra Roy
- Pavitra Sarkar as Bengal Team coach
- Purnendu Bhattacharya as Doctor
- Shruthy Menon as Jazzclub singer
- Ishtiyak Khan as Assistant Coach Hari
- Gursharn Arya as Jessi

== Production ==
Principal photography commenced on 19 August 2019 and experienced long delays due to COVID-19 pandemic and Cyclone Nisarga, ultimately ending in May 2022. The film was scheduled to release in theatres on 3 June 2022 but was delayed due to impending post-production works. The film was set to be released on 23 June 2023 but was delayed again.

== Music ==
Maidaan

Soundtrack album by A.R. Rahman
- Released: 8 April 2024
- Recorded: 2020–2022
- Length: 22:05
- Language: Hindi
- Label: Saregama
- Producer: A.R. Rahman

A.R. Rahman chronology
Amar Singh Chamkila (2024)	Maidaan (2024)	Chhaava (2025)

Originally, the soundtrack for Maidaan was to be composed by Amit Trivedi, with his frequent collaborator Amitabh Bhattacharya penning the lyrics, and dialogue writer Siddhant Mago co-composing the background score with newcomer Mayank Mehra. However, delays in production resulted in Trivedi, Bhattacharya and Mehra exiting, with Mago later being limited to dialogue credits. A.R. Rahman was subsequently hired to replace the quartet.

The music of the film is composed by Rahman while lyrics are written by Manoj Muntashir. The first single titled "Mirza" was released on 18 March 2024. The entire album was released on 8 April 2024.

No.	Title	Lyrics	Singer(s)	Length
1.	"Mirza"	Manoj Muntashir	Javed Ali, Richa Sharma	5:16
2.	"Ranga Ranga"	MC Heam, Ramajogayya Sastry	Vaishali Samant, MC Heam	2:58
3.	"Dil Nahi Todenge"	Manoj Muntashir	Javed Ali	4:18
4.	"Team India Hai Hum"	Manoj Muntashir, Davinder Singh, SlowCheeta	A.R. Rahman, Nakul Abhyankar	2:43
5.	"Jaane Do"	Manoj Muntashir	A.R. Rahman, Hiral Viradia	6:47
Total length:				22:05

== Release ==
=== Theatrical ===
The film had paid previews on 10 April 2024, before releasing nationwide a day later on 11 April coinciding with Eid, in standard formats and IMAX.

=== Home media ===
The film's digital rights have been bagged by Amazon Prime Video and satellite rights acquired by Star Gold. The film premiered on Amazon Prime Video on 5 June 2024.

== Reception ==
Maidaan received mixed reviews from critics. On the review aggregator website Rotten Tomatoes, 64% of 11 critics' reviews are positive, with an average rating of 5.7/10.

India Today’s Sana Farzeen rated the film 4 out of 5 stars and said “Ajay Devgn strikes gold, yet again” Bollywood Hungama critic rated 4 out of 5 stars and wrote "Maidaan is one of the finest sports-based films of Bollywood that rests on a National Award-worthy performance by Ajay Devgn."

Shubhra Gupta from The Indian Express rated the film 2.5/5 and wrote “… makes you want to clap, cheer and shed a proud tear.” and said “Ajay Devgn plays Syed Abdul Rahim with a patent sincerity and only a hint of the slo-mo swagger. His rag-tag team has the kind of composition so syncretic that it makes you ache with nostalgia.” Sukanya Verma of Rediff.com rated 2/5 stars and observed "Maidaan draws out more yawns than yays."

Dhaval Roy of The Times of India gave 4 stars out of 5 and said, "Ajay Devgn shines as Rahim, becoming a larger-than-life figure despite a quiet, understated, dignified demeanour. Priyamani, as his wife Saira, is impressive in every scene. Gajraj Rao, as the devious journalist, hits it out of the park." Vinamra Mathur from Firstpost said, "With Maidaan, Sharma, and writer Riteish Shah want to take us through the 50s and show what the game meant for India", and rated the film 3 stars out of 5.

Rishil Jogani from Pinkvilla gave the film 3.5 stars out of 5 and said, "Maidaan is a work of passion, that can only be envisioned by someone who is really passionate to tell the underdog story of the Indian National Football Team." Simran Srivastav from English Jagran said, "'Maidaan' has been made with passion which is impeccably shown on the big screen. The stellar performances of every actor in 'Maidaan' truly elevate the movie and make it more interesting to watch", and gave 3.5 out of 5 stars.

Anuj Kumar of The Hindu stated "Maidaan needs to be populated as one hopes that it spurs the young generation to take their love for the game from screens to the field and prove the saying that Rahim took Indian football to grave with him wrong."

== Accolades ==
Year	Award	Category	Nominee/Work	Result	Ref.
2025	25th IIFA Awards	Best Actor	Ajay Devgn	Nominated	
2025	25th IIFA Awards	Best Performance in a Negative Role	Gajraj Rao	Nominated	
2025	25th IIFA Awards	Best Music Director	A. R. Rahman	Nominated	
2025	70th Filmfare Awards	Best Actor	Ajay Devgn	Nominated	
2025	70th Filmfare Awards	Best Dialogue	Ritesh Shah	Nominated	
2025	70th Filmfare Awards	Best Film (Critics)	Amit Ravindernath Sharma	Nominated	
2025	70th Filmfare Awards	Music Director	A. R. Rahman	Nominated	
2025	70th Filmfare Awards	Best Background Score	A. R. Rahman	Nominated	
2025	70th Filmfare Awards	Best Male Playback Singer	Javed Ali – "Mirza"	Nominated	
2025	70th Filmfare Awards	Best Editing	Dev Rao Jadhav	Nominated	
2025	70th Filmfare Awards	Best Cinematography	Tushar Kanti Ray	Nominated	
2025	70th Filmfare Awards	Best Sound Design	Nihar Ranjan Samal	Nominated	
2025	70th Filmfare Awards	Best Costume Design	Kriti Kolwanker, Maria Thakaran	Nominated	
2025	70th Filmfare Awards	Best Action	R. P. Yadav, Robert Miller	Nominated	

== See also ==
- India movies on sports
- List of movies made in India on football
- India National Football Team
- Sports culture in India
