= 1960–61 Santosh Trophy =

National Football Championship

Tournament details
- Country: India

Final positions
- Champions: Services (1st title)
- Runners-up: Bengal
- 70 minute matches

The 1960–61 Santosh Trophy was the seventeenth edition of the Santosh Trophy, the main territorial football competition in India. It was held in Kozhikode, Kerala. Services defeated Bengal 1-0 in the final replay to retain the title.

The tournament was played on a makeshift stadium on the municipal grounds where the Corporation Stadium now stands. A South Zone league was played between Mysore, Madras and Andhra Pradesh. This ran in parallel with the main competition. Mysore joined the Group A after their win.

== League ==
=== Group A ===
22 January 1961

Assam	1-0	Rajasthan
Lyngdo	Report	11' Hukum Ram

Calicut
24 January 1961

Bengal	4-1	Rajasthan
Dipu Das 7' 57'; Rahmatullah 34'	Report	11' Hukum Ram

Calicut
26 January 1961

Bengal	1-0	Assam
Arun Ghosh	Report

Calicut
28 January 1961

Bengal	3-1	Mysore
Kannan 34' (?) 68'	Report	Rajagopal

Calicut
30 January 1961

Assam	1-0	Mysore
Navkumar Singha 20'	Report

Calicut

=== Group B ===
21 January 1961

Kerala	2-1	Railways
Chitanandan	Report	P. K. Banerjee

Calicut

The tournament was inaugurated by the Kerala Chief Minister Pattom A. Thanu Pillai.

23 January 1961

Services	1-0	Bombay
Jayaram	Report

Calicut
25 January 1961

Services	2-0	Kerala
Ethiraj 34' 60'	Report

Calicut
Referee: R. Jayaram (Bombay)
27 January 1961

Bombay	1-1	Railways
M. Ghosh 49'	Report	34' T. Bose

Calicut
Referee: Kakkar
29 January 1961

Services	0-0	Railways
	Report

Calicut

== Final ==
Services	0–0	Bengal

Calicut

Services	1–0 replay	Bengal
Thapar 59'

Calicut

== Squads ==
- Bengal : Bose; Rahman, Jarnail Singh and Mushtaq Ahmed; Ahmed Hussain and Mohammed Ali; Dipu Das, Rahmatullah, Kannan, Goswami and Kankidas (subs : Samajpati). Also Arun Ghosh
- Mysore : Varadaraj; Mahadevan, Amir and Thomas; Xavier and Shanmugham; Balasubramaniam, Francis, Krishnan Jetti (subs: Saramat Khan), Rajagopal and Arumainayagam
- Services : Thangaraj (captain); Triloksingh, Antony and Dhanaraj; Mumtaz Hussain and Doraiswamy; Chacko, Janardhanan, Kundu, Ethiraj and Vincent Paul. Also, Jayaram, Sharman
- Railways : Burman; B. Ghosh, Janaki Ram and M. Banerjee; Gulab Singh and Nikhil Nandy; B. Chatterjee, P. K. Banerjee (captain), P. Singh, Varahalu (subs: T. Ghosh) and Jiggins. Also Mondal (goal-keeper), Radhakrishnan, T. Bose, Simon Sundararaj
- Bombay : S. S. Narayan (captain); O. Chandrasekhar, P.R. Antony and Nicholas Fernandez; Franco and R.P.A. Narayanan; Nicholas Miranda, Linky Grostate, Sankar (subs : Janki), Azizul Rehman and Devdas. Also P.B. Shetty
- Kerala : Mustafa; Rajagopal, Balakrishnan (captain) and Madhavan Nair; Indrabalan and S. George; Austin Rex, V.N. George , Chidanandan, Satyavan and Pappachan
