= 1961 IFA Shield final =

- Event: 1961 IFA Shield
Mohun Bagan	East Bengal
- Joint winners declared after a replay

Final
Mohun Bagan	East Bengal
0	0
- Date: 26 September 1961
- Venue: East Bengal–Mohun Bagan Ground, Kolkata, West Bengal
- Referee: Nrisingha Chatterjee
- Attendance: 30,000 (estd.)

Replay
Mohun Bagan	East Bengal
0	0
- Date: 27 September 1961
- Venue: East Bengal–Mohun Bagan Ground, Kolkata, West Bengal
- Referee: Nrisingha Chatterjee
- Attendance: 30,000 (estd.)

The 1961 IFA Shield final was the 60th final of the IFA Shield, the second oldest football competition in India, and was contested between Kolkata giants East Bengal and Mohun Bagan on 26 September 1961 first which ended in a draw and then a replay on 27 September 1961 at the East Bengal–Mohun Bagan Ground in Kolkata respectively.

Both teams failed to score in either of the finals and were declared as joint winners. Mohun Bagan lifted their eight titles while East Bengal won their seventh IFA Shield title.

== Route to the final ==
Mohun Bagan		Round	East Bengal	
Opponent	Result	Round	Opponent	Result
Burnpur United	9–0	Third Round	Wari	3–1
International	3–0	Quarter–Final	Mahishur	3–1
Eastern Railway	0–0; 2–0	Semi–Final	Indian Navy	2–1

== Match ==
=== Summary ===
The IFA Shield final began at the East Bengal-Mohun Bagan Ground in Kolkata on 26 September 1958 in front of a packed crowd as Kolkata giants East Bengal and Mohun Bagan faced each other in a Kolkata Derby. Mohun Bagan, the defending champions, made their fourteenth appearance in the final after they defeated Eastern Railway 2–0 in the semi-final, having won it seven times previously in 1911, 1947, 1948, 1952, 1954, 1956, and 1960. East Bengal reached their eleventh final after defeating Indian Navy 2–1 in the semi-final, having won the title six times previously in 1943, 1945, 1949, 1950, 1951, and 1958.

Both teams tried to take control of the game but neither failed to create chances as both teams cancelled each other out. Salauddin of Mohun Bagan and Sukumar Samajpati of East Bengal got chances but failed to score as the game ended in a 0–0 draw. The IFA Shield committee decided to host the replay final the very next day.

=== Details ===
26 September 1961
15:45 IST

Mohun Bagan	0–0	East Bengal

East Bengal-Mohun Bagan Ground, Kolkata
Attendance: 30,000 (est.)
Referee: Nrisingha Chatterjee

Mohun Bagan	East Bengal

GK	(India) Sanath Sett
DF	(India) Prasanta Sarkhel
DF	(India) Jarnail SIngh
DF	(India) T. Abdul Rahman
MF	(India) Mariappa Kempaiah
MF	(India) Amiya Banerjee
FW	(India) Dipu Das
FW	(India) Amal Chakraborty
FW	(India) Salauddin
FW	(India) Chuni Goswami (c)
FW	(India) Arumainayagam

GK	(India) Abani Bose
DF	(India) Chitto Chanda (c)
DF	(India) Bikramjit Debnath
DF	(India) Arun Ghosh
MF	(India) Srikanta Banerjee
MF	(India) Ram Bahadur Chettri
FW	(India) Sukumar Samajpati
FW	(India) Nilesh Sarkar
FW	(India) Sunil Nandy
FW	(India) Baloo
FW	(India) Dharmalingam Kannan

Match rules

- 70 minutes.
- Replay if scores still level.
- No Substitutes.

== Replay ==
=== Summary ===
The replay final began at the East Bengal-Mohun Bagan Ground in Kolkata on 27 September 1961 after the first game ended in a 0–0 stalemate.

Mohun Bagan kicked off the match and Chuni Goswami tried a long-range effort at the very first minute which was easily collected by East Bengal custodian Abani Bose. East Bengal counterattacked in the fourth minute, but T. Rahman blocked the shot by Dharmalingam Kannan for a corner. Kannan got another opportunity in the seventeenth minute when his shot was saved by Sanath Sett and rebounded off the crossbar onto the feet of Sukumar Samajpati, whose shot again struck the crossbar and went out. In the thirty-first minute, Nilesh Sarkar once again hit the crossbar as East Bengal failed to score. The second half begun in the same way as East Bengal struck the post for the fourth time, when Kannan took a powerful shot in the thirty-eighth minute. Mohun Bagan too got some few chances in the second half but failed to score as the game ended 0–0 in regulation time. An additional fifteen minutes of extra time was played but both teams failed to break the deadlock as the game ended in a 0–0 draw. The IFA decided to declare both the teams as joint winners of the competition. Mohun Bagan captain Chuni Goswami defeated East Bengal captain Citto Chanda in the coin toss which decided that Bagan would keep the Shield for the first six months, followed by East Bengal.

=== Details ===
27 September 1961
15:45 IST

Mohun Bagan	0–0 (a.e.t.)	East Bengal

East Bengal-Mohun Bagan Ground, Kolkata
Attendance: 30,000 (est.)
Referee: Nrisingha Chatterjee

Mohun Bagan	East Bengal

GK	(India) Sanath Sett
DF	(India) Prasanta Sarkhel
DF	(India) Jarnail SIngh
DF	(India) T. Abdul Rahman
MF	(India) Mariappa Kempaiah
MF	(India) Amiya Banerjee
FW	(India) Dipu Das
FW	(India) Amal Chakraborty
FW	(India) Salauddin
FW	(India) Chuni Goswami (c)
FW	(India) Arumainayagam

GK	(India) Abani Bose
DF	(India) Chitto Chanda (c)
DF	(India) Bikramjit Debnath
DF	(India) Arun Ghosh
MF	(India) Srikanta Banerjee
MF	(India) Ram Bahadur Chettri
FW	(India) Sukumar Samajpati
FW	(India) Nilesh Sarkar
FW	(India) Sunil Nandy
FW	(India) Baloo
FW	(India) Dharmalingam Kannan

Match rules

- 70 minutes.
- 15 minutes of extra time if game ends in a draw.
- Joint winners if game ends in a draw after extra time.
- No Substitutes.
