= 1961–62 Santosh Trophy =

National Football Championship

Tournament details
- Country: India

Final positions
- Champions: Railways (1st title)
- Runners-up: Maharashtra
- 70 minute matches

The 1961–62 Santosh Trophy was the eighteenth edition of the Santosh Trophy, the main territorial football competition in India. It was held in Bombay.

Railways defeated Maharashtra 3–0 in the final to win their first title.

== Section 1 ==
8 January 1962

Maharashtra	2–0	Delhi
Miranda 20'; Neville D'Souza 23'	Report

Cooperage Ground, Bombay

Bengal	3–0	Maharashtra

Cooperage Ground, Bombay
12 January 1962

Mysore	1–0	Delhi
Sarmad Khan 36'	Report

Cooperage Ground, Bombay
16 January 1962

Bengal	4–0	Mysore
Sarkar 24'; Balaram 26'; Goswami 60'; Arumainayagam	Report

Cooperage Ground, Bombay
18 January 1962

Bengal	5–0	Delhi
Hamid 29', 45'; Goswami; S. Nandy 50', 64'	Report

Cooperage Ground, Bombay
19 January 1962

Maharashtra	0–0	Mysore
	Report

Cooperage Ground, Bombay
20 January 1962

Maharashtra	3–3 replay	Mysore
Neville D'Souza	Report	Vardaraj; Govindraj

Cooperage Ground, Bombay

The result of the last replay is not available. Maharashtra qualified for the semifinal.

== Section 2 ==
9 January 1962

Railways	5–0	Assam
Dinu Das 20'; Narayan 40'; Appalaraju 45'; P. K. Banerjee	Report

Cooperage Ground, Bombay
11 January 1962

Andhra Pradesh	2–0	Assam
Jaffer 11'; Mohammed Yousuf 32'	Report

Cooperage Ground, Bombay
13 January 1962

Services	2–0	Andhra Pradesh
Ramu 61'; Jones	Report

Cooperage Ground, Bombay
17 January 1962

Railways	0–0	Andhra Pradesh
	Report

Cooperage Ground, Bombay

== Semifinal ==
21 January 1962

Railways	1–0	Bengal
Appalaraju 22'	Report

Cooperage Ground, Bombay
23 January 1962

Maharashtra	3–3	Services
Neville D'Souza 16'; Shankar 22', 32'	Report	4' Jayaraman; 8' Ethiraj; 50' Inas

Cooperage Ground, Bombay
25 January 1962

Maharashtra	1–1 (a.e.t.) replay	Services
Ramakrishnan (o.g.)	Report	Jayaraman

Cooperage Ground, Bombay

0-0 in full time, 10 minutes of extra time played where both teams scored.

27 January 1962

Maharashtra	3–1 replay	Services
Maqbool 14'; Neville D'Souza 18'; Trilok Singh 66' (o.g.)	Report	19' Ethiraj

Cooperage Ground, Bombay

== Final ==
28 January 1962

Railways	3–0	Maharashtra
Narayan 27'; Appalaraju; Dipu Das 68'	Report

Cooperage Ground, Bombay

Railways led 1-0 at half-time. Dipu Das replaced P.K. Banerjee in the 56 minute (pulled thigh muscle). Defense minister V. K. Krishna Menon presented the trophy.

== Squads ==
- Railways : Barman; Williams, Mukherjee and M.Banerjee; Sinha and Tirkey; P. K. Banerjee (Dipu Das sub), Narayan, Appalaraju, Janakiram and Dinu Das
- Maharashtra : Nair; Chandrasekhar, Antony and Mitra; Franco and Maqbool; Derek D'Souza, Shankar, Neville D'Souza, Jaffar and Vishwanath Rao. Also S. S. Narayan (goal-keeper), Shekar, Gadiyar, Miranda, Pavithran
- Services : Gupta; Trilok Singh, Ramakrishnan and Capt. Jones; Narendra Bahadur and Doraiswamy; Vincent Ramu, Siri Bahadur, Narayanaswamy, Ethiraj and Inas. Also Ravindra Singh (goal-keeper), Jayaraman, Jones
- Delhi : P. Dutta; Harbinder Singh, Baldev Raj; Gurmei Singh, Indrajeet Malhotra, Girdhari Lal; Rashid, Srawan Kumar, Avtar Singh, Shujaat Ashraff, S. Ghosh Dastidar
- Andhra Pradesh : Azad; Reddy and Naseem; Patrick, Kaleem and Afzal; Jaffar, Yousuf Khan, Edward, Zulfiqar and Mohammed Yousuf. Also Saleem (goal-keeper), Salen
- Assam : P Hazarika; R. Bhuyan and D. Burman; N. Nag, A. Dutta and C. Gohan; S. Hussain, P. Sarmah, A. Jalil, P. N. Das and H. Majeed
