= Mrityunjoy Banerjee (football player) =

Indian footballer

Personal information
- Position: Defender

Senior career*
Years	Team	Apps	(Gls)
- Mohun Bagan

International career
- India
Medal record
Men's football
Representing India
AFC Asian Cup
Runner-up	1964 Israel	Team
- * Club domestic league appearances and goals

Mrityunjoy Banerjee is a former Indian association football player. He was part of the team that finished at second place at the 1964 AFC Asian Cup.

== Honours ==
India

- AFC Asian Cup runners-up: 1964
