= Shibdas Bhaduri =

Indian footballer

Personal information
- Full name: Shibdas Bhaduri
- Date of birth: 6 November 1887
- Place of birth: Barisal, Bengal Presidency, British India
- Date of death: 26 February 1932 (aged 44)
- Place of death: Puri, Odisha, British India

Shibdas Bhaduri (6 November 1887 – 26 February 1932) was an Indian footballer played as a striker. He captained Mohun Bagan in the historic 1911 IFA Shield final on 29 July 1911, where they defeated the East Yorkshire Regiment in final, with a score of 2–1 to become the first Indian team to win the competition.

== Playing career ==
Bhaduri took his first formal football training from legendary coach Sir Dukhiram Majumder, who was father figure of Kolkata football and first Indian football coach. Considered as Indian football's first icon, Bhaduri began his club football career with Mohun Bagan in 1905. In the same year, he helped the team reaching Gladstone Cup final, held in Chinsurah. They won title defeating Dalhousie AC in the final, in which he scored four goals. Seeing his evasion technique in field, British sahibs of that time used to say him "Slippery Shibdas". In 1906, they won the Minto Fort tournament by defeating Calcutta FC.

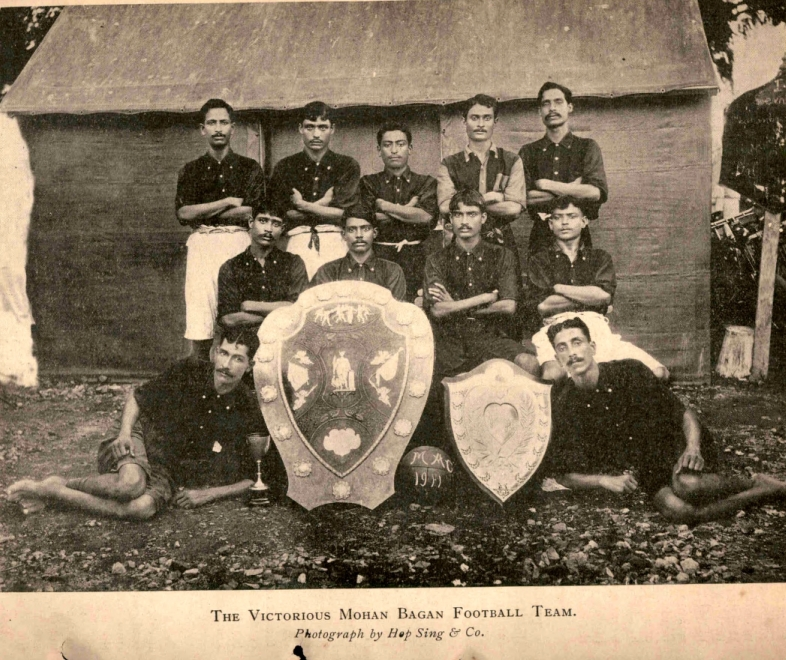
Bhaduri and others after winning the IFA Shield in 1911

Ahead of the 1911 IFA Shield, he was given the opportunity of assembling a squad to fight against British army teams. Except Reverend Sudhir Chatterjee, Shibdas and other players appeared in the tournament barefooted. He captained Mohun Bagan in the tournament, in which they defeated multiple British teams.

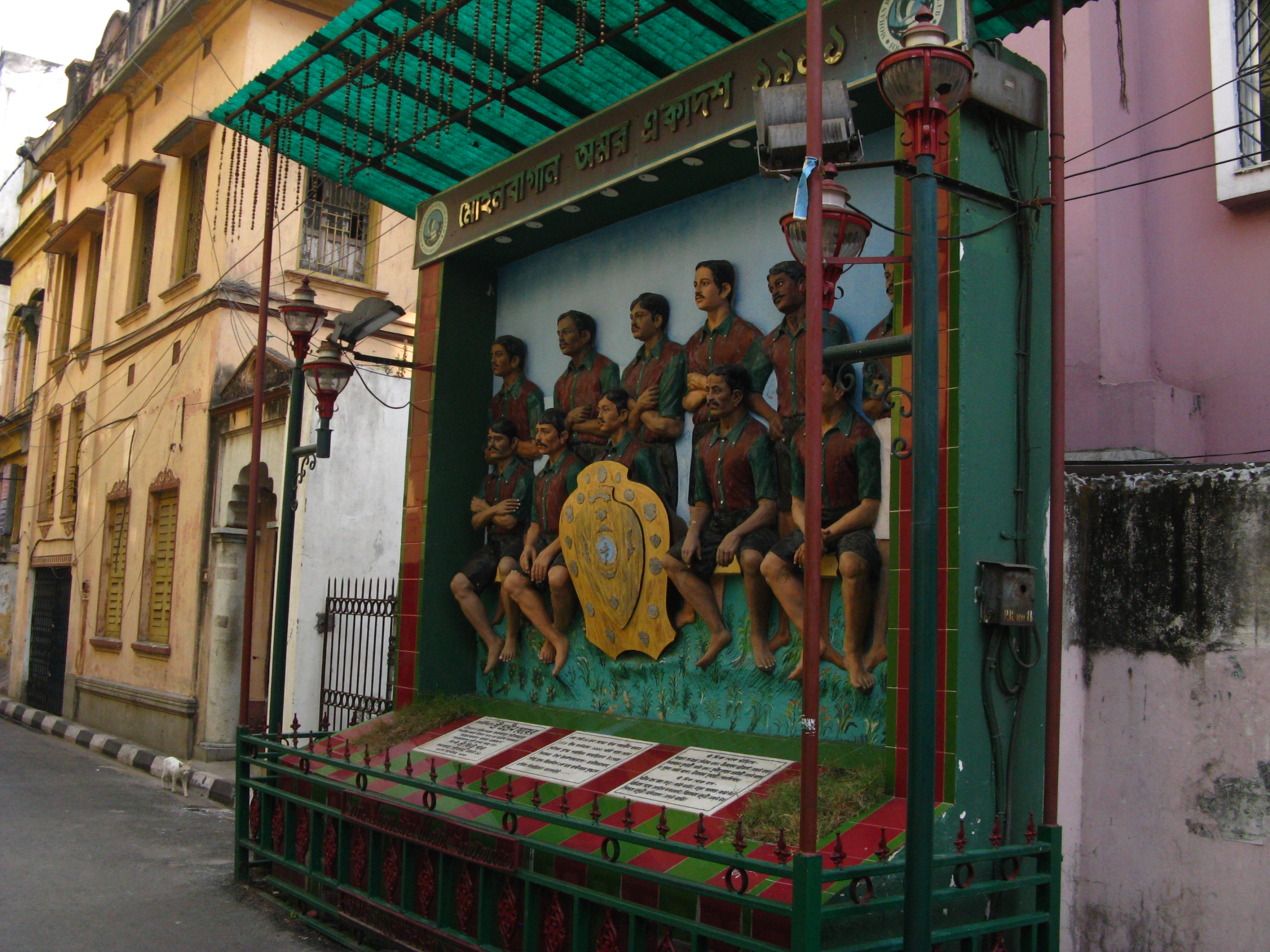
Mohun Bagan Omor Ekadosh memorial in North Kolkata

A team of Bengalees won the Football Association Shield in India after defeating the crack teams of three British Regiments amidst the applause of 80,000 of their countrymen. There is no reason of course to be surprised. Victory of association football goes to the side with the greatest physical fitness, the quickest eye, and the keenest wit.

— The Manchester Guardian commented after Bhaduri led Mohun Bagan clinched IFA Shield title on 29 July 1911.

Along with elder brother Bijoydas Bhaduri, he played as a forward in the tournament and began their journey defeating St. Xavier's College 3–0. They later went on to beat Calcutta Rangers Club 2–1, Rifle Brigade 1–0 in pre-quarter and quarter final respectively. The semi-final rematch against Middlesex Regiment (after the first match initially ended in a 1–1) also went in favour of them as Mohun Bagan defeated the side 3–0 to reach the Shield final. In the final on 29 July, in front of thousands of spectators, Bhaduri scored the equalizer to level the match 1–1 before Abhilash Ghosh scoring the winner from his pass in their historic 2–1 win. That is why, July 29 is celebrated as the "Mohun Bagan Day".

After winning the Shield, Bhaduri continued playing for the club and appeared until 1917. He represented Mohun Bagan consecutively in Calcutta Football League second division with players like Gostha Pal, Abhilash Ghosh and others, and appeared in the first division for the first time in 1915 when they became one of few non-military teams, promoted to CFL premier division. He also played in Asanullah Cup in Decca in 1916 with latter stars like Umapati Kumar and Bhuti Sukul, in which Mohun Bagan went down to Nagendra Prasad Sarbadhikari's Sovabazar Club in final.

== Personal life ==
Bhaduri was born on 6 November 1887 in Barishal, Bengal Presidency (now in Bangladesh). In his childhood, Bhaduri family settled in Shyambazar. Outside of football, he was a veterinarian, and was associated with Calcutta Veterinary College.

Bhaduri had five brothers, Haridas, Tulsidas, Dwiajdas, Bijoydas and Ramdas; four of them except Haridas played football for Mohun Bagan.

== Death ==
Bhaduri was suffering from Tuberculosis. While visiting the Indian pilgrim town of Puri in 1932, he was contracted malaria and died on 26 February, aged 44.

== Legacy ==
After the Shield win in 1911, Bhaduri was felicitated by Nripendra Narayan, Maharaja of the Cooch Behar State. In 1960, the Calcutta Municipal Corporation renamed Fariapukur Street to Shibdas Bhaduri Sarani in memory of him. During the centenary celebration in 1993, the Indian Football Association (IFA) organized Shibdas Bhaduri Trophy as a tribute to him. In 2003, he was posthumously awarded the Mohun Bagan Ratna by Mohun Bagan AC.

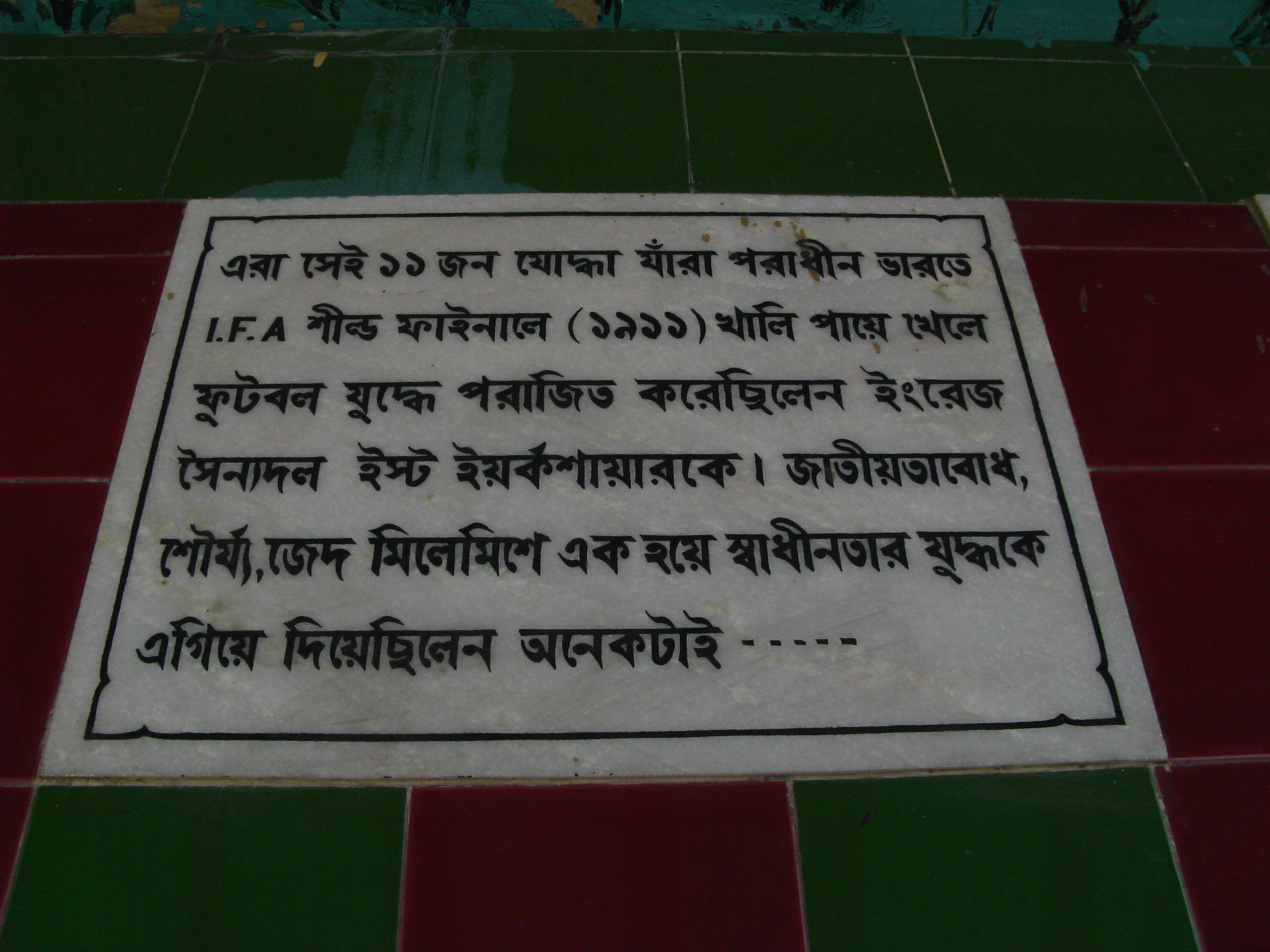
Marble plaque commemorating Bhaduri led Mohun Bagan's historic IFA Shield win

In 2011, a Bengali movie named Egaro (Egaro, the Immortal Eleven) was released, in which Shibdas Bhaduri was portrayed by actor Hirak Das. Directed by debutant director Arun Roy, the film is predominantly based on the historical events leading to a football match between Bhaduri led Mohun Bagan and British army team East Yorkshire Regiment on 29 July 1911, a time when India was under the British rule. This was the first time when Mohun Bagan, or any native team won the IFA Shield. The film commemorated that event in its centenary year 2011. Abhilash Ghosh is portrayed by Ronodeep Bose. In an upcoming Bollywood movie named 1911, based on the 1911 IFA Shield final match, Shibdas will be portrayed by actor John Abraham.

The victory awakened a freedom struggle that had seemingly lost its momentum a little bit and provided the much-needed inspiration to the youth of a colonised nation. I am fortunate to get married in this family (Bhaduri's), which has such a great heritage. The honour we are receiving today is due to Shibdas Bhaduri. FIFA's recognition of the triumph and getting the first ticket of the U-17 World Cup is a huge honour.

— Gouri Bhaduri, granddaughter-in-law of Shibdas Bhaduri, after receiving the first ticket of the 2017 FIFA U-17 World Cup from FC Barcelona legend Carles Puyol.

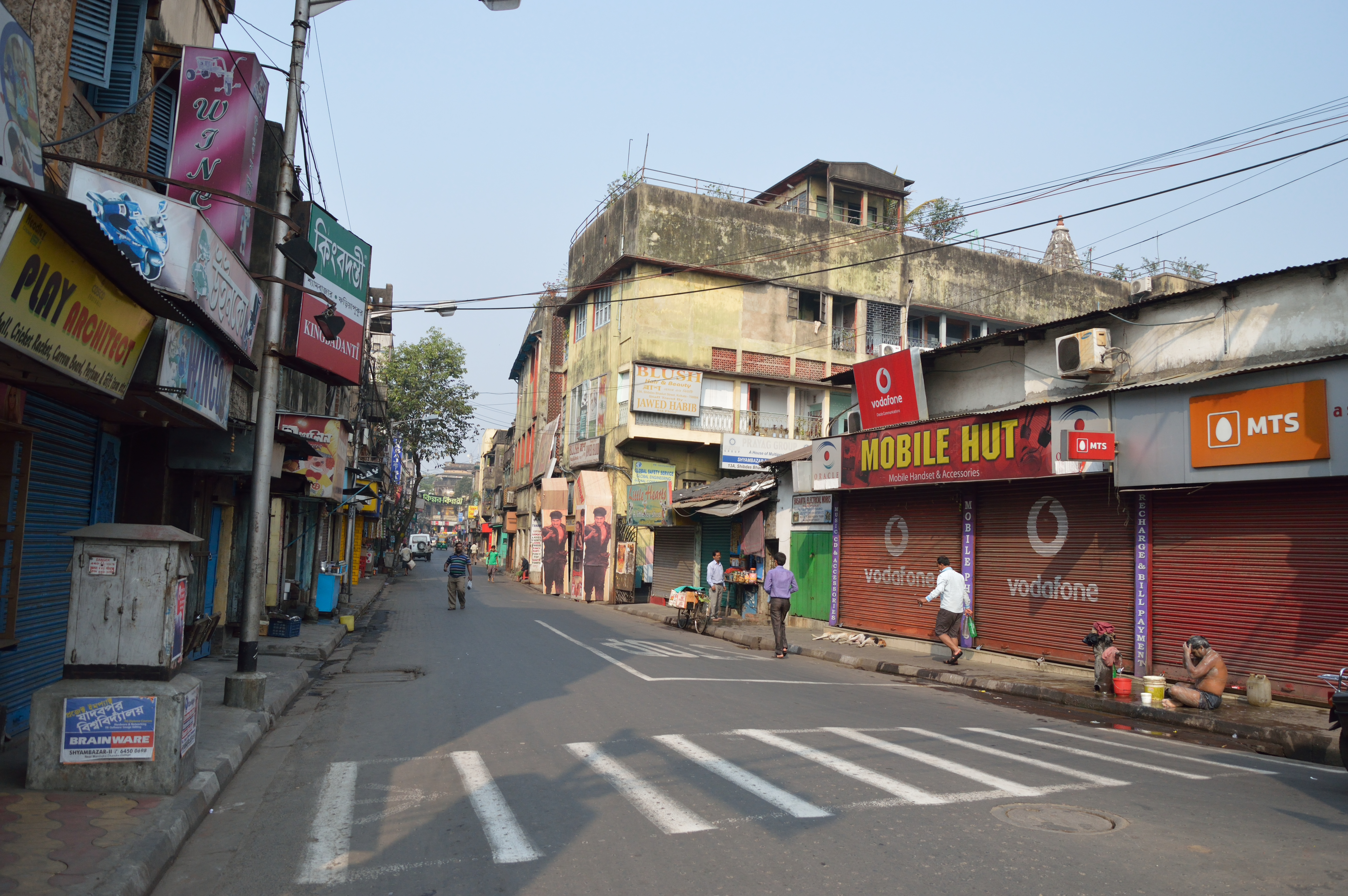
Shibdas Bhaduri Street in North Kolkata, named after Shibdas Bhaduri.

In July 2022, Mohun Bagan AC announced the club awards have been named after famous personalities to be awarded to sportspersons every year henceforth, and "Best Football Player" award was renamed as Shibdas Bhaduri Award in memory of him, which was won by Liston Colaco.

== Honours ==
Mohun Bagan

- Gladstone Cup: 1905, 1906, 1908, 1911
- Minto Fort Cup: 1906
- Cooch Behar Cup: 1905, 1907, 1908, 1916
- IFA Shield: 1911
- Trades Cup: 1906, 1907, 1908
- Bengal Jimkhana Shield: 1910, 1911, 1912
- Asanullah Cup runner-up: 1916

Individual

- Mohun Bagan Ratna Award: 2003

== See also ==
- History of Mohun Bagan AC
- Football in Kolkata
- History of Indian football
