= Kajal Mukherjee =

Indian footballer

Kajal Mukherjee কাজল মুখার্জি
Personal information
- Full name: Ajoy Kajal Mukherjee
- Date of birth: 1942
- Place of birth: Bengal, British India
- Date of death: 10 July 2006 (aged 64)
- Place of death: Kolkata, West Bengal, India
- Position: Midfielder

Senior career*
Years	Team	Apps	(Gls)
- Eastern Railways
- East Bengal
- Mohun Bagan
- Mohammedan SC

International career
- India
Medal record
Men's football
Representing India
AFC Asian Cup
Runner-up	1964 Israel	Team
- * Club domestic league appearances and goals

Ajoy Kajal Mukherjee was a former Indian association football player. He played at the 1964 AFC Asian Cup, where India national football team finished second. He also represented India at the 1966 Asian Games Football tournament. He died in the year 2006.

== Honours ==
India

- AFC Asian Cup runners-up: 1964
- Merdeka Tournament runner-up: 1964; third-place: 1965, 1966

East Bengal

- IFA Shield: 1970
