= Egaro =

2011 Indian Bengali film

- Release poster
- Directed by: Arun Roy
- Produced by: Magic Hour Entertainment
- Starring: Monu Mukhopadhyay; Shankar Chakraborty; Rajat Ganguly; Biswajit Chakraborty; Tulika Basu; Debaparna Chakraborty; Tamal Roy Choudhury; Sunil Mukherjee; Kharaj Mukherjee; Gautam Haldar; Bhaskar Banerjee; Ranadip Bose; Hirak Das; Chandan Bhattacharjee; Uday Pratap Singh
- Cinematography: Gopi Bhagat
- Edited by: Sanglap Bhowmik; Shyamal Karmakar
- Music by: Mayukh-Moinak
- Release date: 21 January 2011
- Country: India
- Language: Bengali

Egaro: The Eleven (transl. Eleven) is a 2011 Indian Bengali-language period epic sports action film written and directed by Arun Roy in his directorial debut. The film is based on the historical events leading to the football match between Mohun Bagan and East Yorkshire Regiment on 29 July 1911, a time when India was under the British rule. This was the first time when Mohun Bagan, or any native team won the IFA Shield. The film commemorated that event in its centenary year 2011.

== Plot ==
Egaro is also the first celluloid tribute to the eleven Mohun Bagan players who won the shield, ten of them playing barefoot clad in folded dhotis with just one of them, Sudhir Chatterjee, wearing boots against a team with the right kit, boots, dress, infrastructural support and the typical bias of the White rulers against the coloured Ruled. But Egaro is not just about football. It is about the patriotic passion that drove these eleven players to unite thousands of Indians from the entire eastern regions who flocked in from Dhaka, Burdwan, Midnapore crossing barriers of caste, class, community and language to watch the players kick and beat up the British teams on the playing field without being punished by the rulers because it was all in the game. It is about the killer spirit where the killer took prominence not because it was a fight to finish, but because the final match was a battlefield where the winning could speed the movement against Imperial rule and towards freedom. It did, in a manner of speaking. After the historic win on 29 July 1911, the British felt pressured enough to shift its capital from Calcutta to Delhi on 12 December the same year.

The film explores a parallel theme of an underground revolution brimming underneath following the Partition of Bengal in 1905 and the hanging of Khudiram Bose for attempting to kill Kingsford in 1908. Nagendra (Shankar Chakraborty) leads a group of young freedom fighters in a fight to eliminate high-ranking British officers with indigenous bombs and fire-arms without harming the old, the women and the children. He castigates one of his revolutionaries, also a Mohun Bagan player, for paying more attention to football than to the revolution. But over time, he is convinced that this final match is no less than the revolution he is leading. He comes to the finals and motivates the same member he threw out to rise and play when he faints during the match felled by one of the many false kicks of the British team.

Mohun Bagan had entered the finals after having vanquished strong teams of the British side such as Rangers, St. Xaviers and Middlesex which consolidated the team's confidence that the British teams were not as unconquerable as they thought. East Yorkshire Regiment scored one goal before half-time sending the entire audience into a tizzy and depressing the home team. But after half-time, the team scored two goals one by Captain Sibdas Bhaduri and the other by Abhilash Ghosh, a striker. The preparation towards the final match spans a major slice of the film including family and personal hurdles the team members face. Abhilash is a student at Scottish Church College, along with teammate Rajen Sengupta. Abhilash's father does not care about his brilliant son's involvement in a game that might anger the British rulers. Abhilash himself begins to rethink his stance because football, he feels, has reduced his duties towards those he loves. Sudhir Chatterjee, professor in the London Missionary Society College is insulted in the staff room by his British colleagues for daring to participate in a match against a British team. The Principal suspends him indefinitely. But Shibdas is determined to win even if one or two of the team drop out at the last minute. They don't.

Two British citizens prove that they too, are human. One of them is the match referee Puller who refuses to bend under pressure by the powers-that-be to treat the match as a ‘must-win-or-else’ ego trip against native Indians. The other is Piggot, a player of the Middlesex team who was badly injured in one eye by an inadvertent kick delivered by Abhilash. He gives Abhilash a clean chit though the officers who visit him at the hospital urge him to pronounce the Indian team player's kick as intentional.

Egaro is a sports film where reality has been intermixed with elements of fiction. This makes the film more entertaining and exciting, filled with moments of suspense, hilarity, drama and a bit of romance thrown in delicately between Abhilash and Bina and the one-sided attraction his British colleague, the beautiful Elina feels towards her colleague Sudhir. Her reactions on the field where she sits on the British side and when Mohun Bagan scores each goal, she begins to fan herself rapidly to express her joy. The reactions of the audience provide a wonderful sense of relief and bonhomie and solidarity and patriotism bonded as one. Though three of the eight players are professional football players, their acting is beyond par and one cannot make the difference between the actors and the players. The cameos are wonderfully portrayed by renowned actors of Bengali cinema, theatre and television. The revolutionary segment is a bit overdrawn and dramatic at times. The tremendous violence by the police who kill revolutionary Satyen's grandfather in prison could have been cut out. The flames of his pyre arousing flames of anger within his granddaughter Bina is a powerful touch.

Gopi Bhagat's cinematography in one word is brilliant. Indraneel Ghosh's art direction reproduces the period with old mansions and homes with brick walls with the plaster peeling off, the roadside shop selling hot fritters, the college staff room, the prison cell with amazing accuracy. Mayukh-Moinak's music is very good but the background score by Arijit Singh is a bit too loud drowning the ambient sounds and the dialogue at some places.

== Cast ==
- Monu Mukherjee
- Shankar Chakraborty
- Rajat Ganguly
- Biswajit Chakraborty as Club Chairman
- Tulika Basu
- Debaparna Chakraborty
- Tamal Roychoudhury
- Sunil Mukherjee
- Kharaj Mukherjee
- Gautam Haldar
- Bhaskar Banerjee
- Ranadip Bose as Abhilash Ghosh
- Hirak Das as Shibdas Bhaduri
- Chandan Bhattacharjee as Reverant Sudhir Chatterjee
- Uday Pratap Singh as Hiralal
- Daviench
- Kelvin
- Kyle Smith
- Justin Nicholas Smith
- Manish Chakraborty as Jatindranath "Kanu" Roy
- Nilanjan Bhowmik as Habul "Shrish" Sarkar
- Bijeet Basu as Rajen Sengupta
- Baidyanath Das as Bijaydas Bhaduri

Source: IMDb

== Soundtrack ==
All music is composed by Mayukh-Moinak.

No.	Title	Lyrics	Singer(s)	Length
1.	"Amader Surjo Merun"	Sumanta Choudhury	Arijit Singh, Avik	4:09
2.	"E Sudhu Khela Noy"		Arijit Singh, Avik, Goutam	5:50
3.	"E Dhulo Paye Paye Ador Daye"			3:31

== See also ==
- List of association football films
