= Hiralal Mukherjee =

Indian footballer

Personal information
- Date of birth: 14 October 1886
- Place of birth: Bengal Presidency, British India
- Date of death: 14 December 1962 (aged 76)
- Height: 1.60 m (5 ft 3 in)
- Position: Goalkeeper

Senior career*
Years	Team	Apps	(Gls)
1906–?	Mohun Bagan		
- * Club domestic league appearances and goals

Hiralal Mukherjee (14 October 1886 – 14 December 1962) was an Indian professional footballer who played as a goalkeeper. He was a member of the "Immortal XI", of Mohun Bagan, that won the IFA Shield in 1911.

== Early life ==
On 14 October 1886, Mukherjee was born to a middle-class family in the erstwhile Bengal Presidency of British India. He grew up and had his early education in the Bagbazar locality of Calcutta (now Kolkata). At a young age, he lost his father and following which he moved to Howrah with his elder sister. Passing the entrance exam at the Howarh Zilla School in 1904, he got himself enrolled at the Bengal Engineering College (now Indian Institute of Engineering Science and Technology) in Shibpur. This was when he quit his studies and took to football as a profession. He was encouraged to take up goalkeeping by Sailen Basu, an official at Mohun Bagan, the club which Mukherjee first played for.

== Career ==
Mukherjee began his club career with Mohun Bagan in 1906. As a goalkeeper, he was known for his ability to storm into the tackles of the opposition strikers.

He was part of the team that won the IFA Shield in 1911, when they beat East Yorkshire Regiment 2–1 in the final. The winning team was titled "Immortal XI" following the victory. This is viewed as a turning point in Indian football, as a team of Indian natives on bare foot had beaten a well coached British team. Mukherjee's best moment at the tournament came when he saved three penalties against Rangers Football Club in the second game of the tournament, a match that Bagan won 2–1.
