= Lo Tak Kuen =

Hong Kong footballer (1940–2022)

Lo Tak Kuen 盧德權
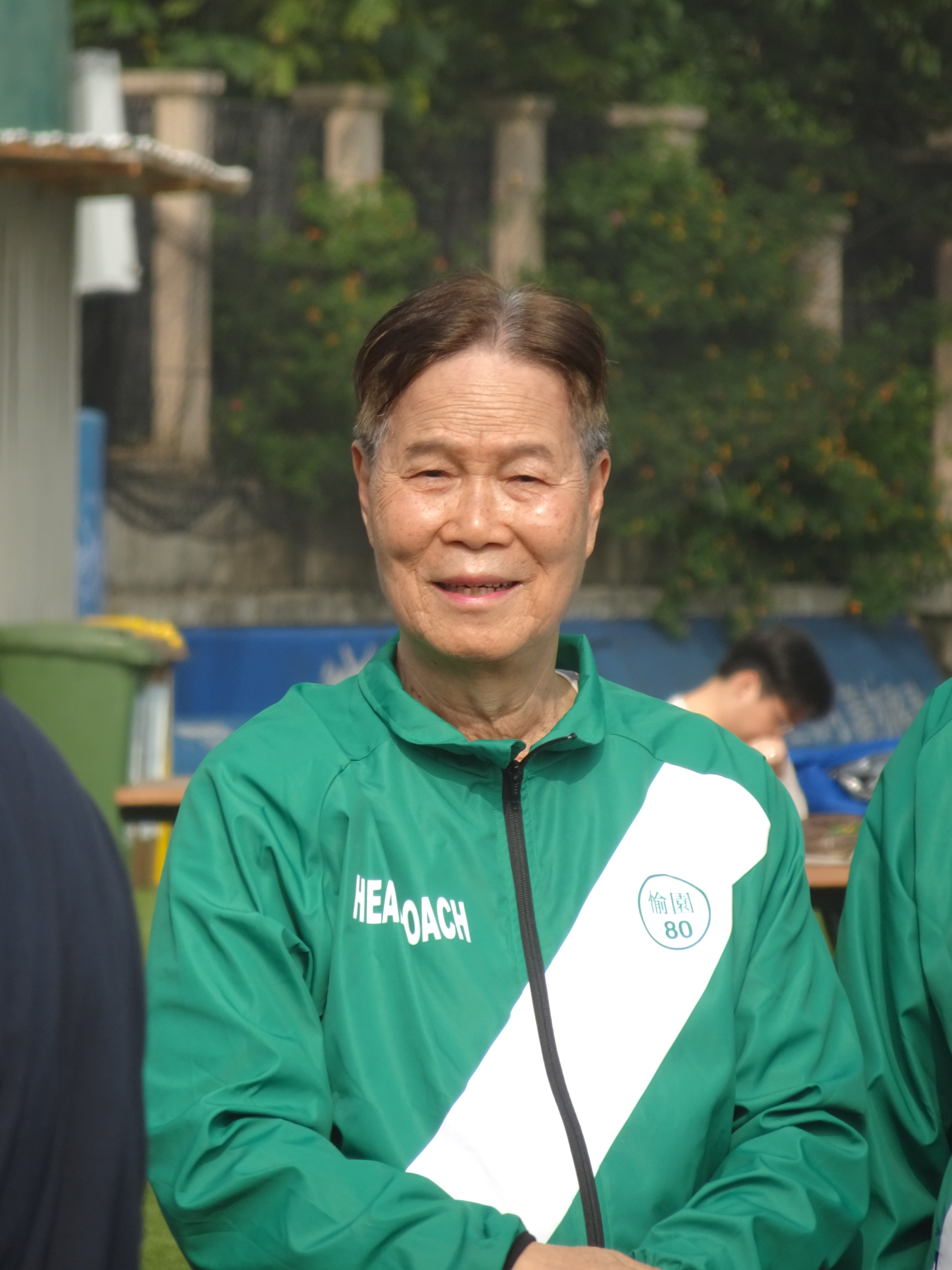
- Lo Tak Kuen in 2019

Personal information
- Full name: Lo Tak Kuen
- Date of birth: 1940
- Date of death: 24 September 2022 (aged 82)
- Place of death: Hong Kong
- Position: Goalkeeper

Senior career*
Years	Team	Apps	(Gls)
1959–1963	Happy Valley AA		
1963–1965	Kitchee		
1965–1974	Happy Valley AA		

International career
1960s–1970s	Hong Kong		

Managerial career
- Happy Valley AA (assistant)
- Happy Valley AA
- Seiko SA
- Hong Kong
- Sing Tao
- * Club domestic league appearances and goals

Lo Tak Kuen (Chinese: 盧德權; 1940 – 24 September 2022) was a Hong Kong footballer and manager. During his career, he gained the nickname "Lo the Hero".

== Career ==
As a footballer, Lo started his career at Happy Valley AA, where he retired in 1974 and became an assistant manager. He also played for the Hong Kong national team during the 1960s and 1970s, representing them at both the 1964 and 1968 AFC Asian Cups, being selected in the Best XI for the 1964 tournament.

Following his retirement, Lo worked as a manager at Happy Valley AA, Seiko SA, the Hong Kong national team, and Sing Tao. Additionally, he acquired several coaching qualifications, including a FIFA instructor's license, an Asian Football Confederation coaching instructor's license, and a British senior football coaching license, which he studied under Sir Bobby Robson.

During the 1990s, Lo also worked as a commentator for ESPN Asia.

== Personal life and death ==
Lo attended Hou Kong Middle School in the Province of Macau. His goal as a football manager was to one day coach the China national football team.

On 23 September 2022, Lo was admitted to Queen Elizabeth Hospital after an illness. On the morning of 24 September, he suffered a stroke and cerebral hemorrhage and fell into a coma, before passing away that afternoon at the age of 82.
