= 2012 IFA Shield final =

- Event: 2012 IFA Shield
East Bengal	Prayag United
0	0
- East Bengal won 4–2 on penalties
- Date: 16 March 2012
- Venue: Salt Lake Stadium, Kolkata, West Bengal
- Man of the Match: Gurpreet Singh Sandhu
- Referee: Santosh Kumar (Kerala)
- Attendance: 30,000 (approx.)

The 2012 IFA Shield final was the 116th final of the IFA Shield, the second oldest football competition in India, and was contested between Kolkata clubs East Bengal and Prayag United on 16 March 2012.

East Bengal won the final 4–2 via penalties after the game remained goal-less after extra-time, to claim their 28th IFA Shield title.

== Route to the final ==
=== East Bengal ===
Date	Round	Opposition	Score
3 March 2012	Group Stage	Bhawanipore FC	2–1
9 March 2012	Group Stage	Shillong Lajong	3–0
13 March 2012	Semi Final	Pailan Arrows	1–0

East Bengal entered the 2012 IFA Shield as one of the I-League playing teams from Kolkata and were allocated into Group A alongside Shillong Lajong and Bhawanipore FC. In the opening game against Bhawanipur, East Bengal managed a 2–1 victory with striker Robin Singh scoring a brace. Biswajit Biswas scored the goal for Bhawanipur. In the second group game against Shillong Lajong, East Bengal managed a comfortable 3–0 win with goals from Tolgay Ozbey, Gurwinder Singh and Robin Singh, to secure a place in the semis. In the Semi Final, East Bengal club faced Pailan Arrows, the topper of Group C, and managed a 1–0 win courtesy of a Tolgay Ozbey strike to enter the final for the 40th time.

=== Prayag United ===
Date	Round	Opposition	Score
7 March 2012	Group Stage	Mumbai F.C.	3–2
11 March 2012	Group Stage	Techno Aryan	1–0
14 March 2012	Semi Final	Botafogo BFR	1–0

Prayag United entered the 2012 IFA Shield as one of the I-League playing teams from Kolkata and were allocated into Group D alongside Mumbai F.C. and Techno Aryan. In their opening game, they defeated Mumbai FC 3–2 with Yusif Yakubu scoring a brace and Denson Devadas scoring the other for Prayag. Gbeneme Friday and Chhangte Malsawmkima scored for Mumbai. In their second game, Prayag defeated Aryan 1–0 with a long range effort from Bello Razaq to reach the semis. In the Semi-Final, Prayag United faced Brazilian team Botafogo BFR and won 1–0 courtesy of a goal from Kiwi striker Kayne Vincent in the 115th minute to take Prayag United into the final.

== Match ==
=== Details ===
16 March 2012
14:30 IST

East Bengal	0–0 (a.e.t.)	Prayag United
	Report
Penalties
Ozbey (penalty scored); Khanthang Paite (penalty scored); Robin Singh (penalty scored); Subodh Kumar (penalty scored)	4–2	(penalty missed) James Singh; (penalty missed) Bello Razaq; (penalty scored) Jayanta Sen; (penalty scored) Yusif Yakubu

Salt Lake Stadium, Kolkata
Attendance: 30,000 (est.)
Referee: Santosh Kumar (Kerala)

East Bengal	Prayag United

GK	(India) Gurpreet Singh Sandhu
RB	(India) Saikat Saha Roy	(substituted off) 77'
CB	(Nigeria) Uga Okpara (c)
CB	(India) Gurwinder Singh
LB	(India) Saumik Dey
RM	(India) Sushanth Mathew	(substituted off) 20'
CM	(India) Subodh Kumar
CM	(Nigeria) Penn Orji
LM	(India) Harmanjot Khabra	(substituted off) 93'
ST	(India) Robin Singh
ST	(Australia) Tolgay Ozbey
Substitutes:
MF	(India) Sanju Pradhan	(substituted in) 20'
MF	(India) Khanthang Paite	(substituted in) 77'
DF	(India) Robert Lalthlamuana	(substituted in) 93'
Manager:
(England) Trevor James Morgan

GK	(India) Abhijit Mondal
RB	(India) Anupam Sarkar
CB	(India) Deepak Mondal	(substituted off) 14'
CB	(Nigeria) Bello Razaq
LB	(India) Narugopal Hait
LM	(India) James Singh
CM	(India) Denson Devadas
CM	(India) Jayanta Sen (c)
RM	(India) Gouranga Biswas	(substituted off) 103'
ST	(India) Md. Rafique	(substituted off) 50'
ST	(Ghana) Yusif Yakubu
Substitutes:
MF	(India) Sukhen Dey	(substituted in) 14'
DF	(New Zealand) Kayne Vincent	(substituted in) 50'
FW	(India) Shankar Oraon	(substituted in) 103'
Manager:
(India) Sanjoy Sen

Hero of the Match:
Gurpreet Singh Sandhu (East Bengal)

Match rules

- 90 minutes.
- 30 minutes of extra time if necessary.
- Penalty shoot-out if scores still level.

== See also ==
- IFA Shield 2012
