= 1911 IFA Shield final =

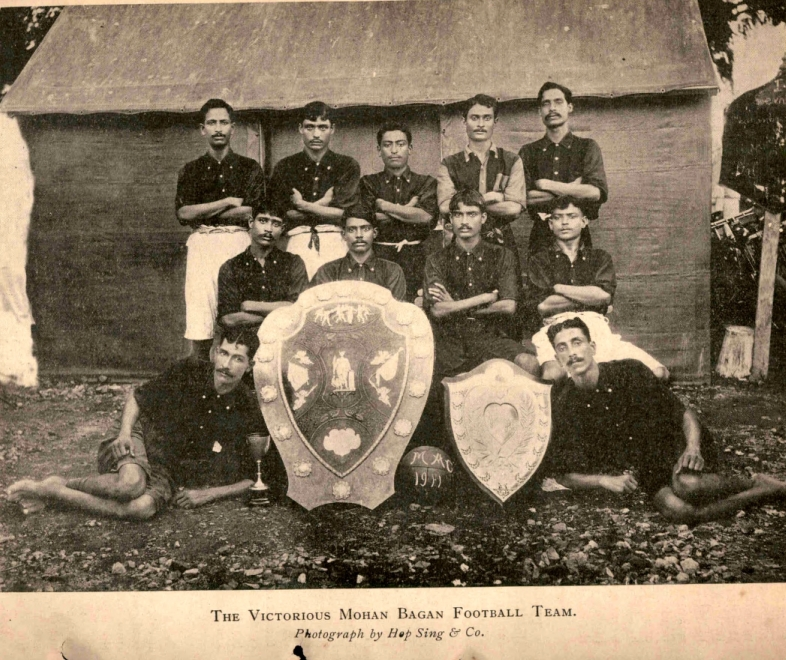
- The Mohun Bagan squad, pictured with the 1911 IFA Shield trophy.
- Event: 1911 IFA Shield
Mohun Bagan	East Yorkshire Regiment
2	1
- Date: 29 July 1911
- Venue: Calcutta FC Ground, Calcutta, India
- Referee: H.G. Pooler
- Attendance: 80,000

The 1911 IFA Shield final was the first time an all Indian team, which consisted of purely Bengali players, had won the tournament. The final took place between Mohun Bagan and British East Yorkshire Regiment, the match was played at the Calcutta Ground, Mohun Bagan won the match by 2–1, enabling themselves to left the title for the very first time and becoming the first ever Indian team to achieve this accomplishment.

== Route to the final ==
Mohun Bagan		Round	Royal Warwickshire Regiment	
Opponent	Result	Round	Opponent	Result
St. Xavier's College	3–0	Round 1	Unknown	N/A
Calcutta Rangers	2–1	Round 2	Unknown	N/A
Rifle Brigade	1–0	Round 3	Unknown	N/A
1st Middlesex	3–0	Semi–Final	Unknown	N/A

== Match ==
=== Summary ===
On July 29, 1911, the final of the IFA Shield, between Mohun Bagan and the British East Yorkshire Regiment ensued. The match began at 5:30, the game would see the first goal scored by the East Yorks, who took the lead, as the team was awarded a free-kick just outside the box, due to a handball from a Mohun Bagan player. Jackson, who took the free-kick, took a shot which goalkeeper Hiralal could not save in time, leading to the Yorkshire Regiment to take the lead. Five minutes later, Shibdas Bhaduri scored the equalizer, enabling Mohun Bagan to stay on the same level as their opponents, after the interval, the rest of the game stayed in back and forth motions. Eventually, nearing the end of the game, Abhilash Ghosh, who received a pass from Shibdas Bhaduri, managed to net in the goal in the final moments of the game. After the final whistle was blown, Mohun Bagan became the first Indian club to win the competition for the very first time.

=== Details ===
12 December 1940

Mohun Bagan	2–1	East Yorkshire Regiment
Shibdas Bhaduri 6'; Abhilash Ghosh 88'		Jackson 1'

Calcutta FC Ground, British India
Attendance: 80,000–100,000 (est.)
Referee: H.G. Pooler

Mohun Bagan lineup
Position	Player
GK	(British Raj) Hiralal Mukherjee
FB	(British Raj) Bhuti Sukul
FB	(British Raj) Sudhir Chatterjee
HB	(British Raj) Monmohun Mukherjee
HB	(British Raj) Rajen Sengupta
HB	(British Raj) Nil Madhav Bhattacharya
FW	(British Raj) Jitendranath Roy
FW	(British Raj) Habul Sarkar
FW	(British Raj) Abhilash Ghosh
FW	(British Raj) Bijoydas Bhaduri
FW	(British Raj) Shibdas Bhaduri

East Yorks lineup
Position	Player
GK	(United Kingdom) Cresay
FB	(United Kingdom) Whitey
FB	(United Kingdom) Scully
HB	(United Kingdom) Martin
HB	(United Kingdom) Jackson
HB	(United Kingdom) Neil
FW	(United Kingdom) Birch
FW	(United Kingdom) Dixon
FW	(United Kingdom) Haywood
FW	(United Kingdom) Howard
FW	(United Kingdom) Clucas
