= K. Appalaraju =

Indian association football player

Kosuru Appalaraju
Personal information
- Full name: Kosuru Appalaraju
- Place of birth: Visakhapatnam, Andhra Pradesh
- Position: Forward

Senior career*
Years	Team	Apps	(Gls)
- Bengal Nagpur Railway

International career
- India
Medal record
Men's football
Representing India
AFC Asian Cup
Runner-up	1964 Israel	Team
- * Club domestic league appearances and goals

K. Appalaraju (born September 1939, Visakhapatnam) (Telugu: కె. అప్పలరాజు) was an Indian footballer. He was part of the Indian Squad that finished runners-up in 1964 AFC Asian Cup.

== Career ==
Appalaraju started in the Polar Star Club, Visakhapatnam from where he moved to Bengal Nagpur Railway in 1959.

He scored a goal in a 2–0 win over South Korea in 1964 Asian Cup. He also scored two hat-tricks in a 5–3 & 7–0 win over Sri Lanka in 1964 Summer Olympics Football tournament qualification.

== Honours ==
India

- AFC Asian Cup runners-up: 1964

Railways

- Santosh Trophy: 1961–62

Individual

- Calcutta Football League top scorer: 1959 (with 24 goals)
