= Chhaava (soundtrack) =

- Soundtrack album cover

Soundtrack album by A. R. Rahman
- Released: 11 February 2025
- Recorded: 2023–2024
- Studios: Panchathan Record Inn, Chennai; Panchathan Studios, Mumbai; Rottenbiller Utca, Budapest; Cafe Musica, Chennai
- Genre: Feature film soundtrack
- Length: 27:10
- Language: Hindi
- Label: Sony Music India
- Producer: A. R. Rahman

A. R. Rahman chronology
Maidaan (2024)	Chhaava (2025)	Thug Life (2025)
External audio
- Chhaava - Full Audio Jukebox on YouTube

Singles from Chhaava
- 1. "Jaane Tu" Released: 31 January 2025; 2. "Aaya Re Toofan" Released: 6 February 2025

Chhaava is the soundtrack album to the 2025 film of the same name directed by Laxman Utekar and produced by Dinesh Vijan under Maddock Films. An adaptation of the eponymous novel by Shivaji Sawant, which is based on the life of Sambhaji Maharaj, the second ruler of the Maratha Empire, it stars Vicky Kaushal, Rashmika Mandanna and Akshaye Khanna. The music is composed by A. R. Rahman which featured six songs with lyrics by Irshad Kamil and Kshitij Patwardhan.

Two songs—"Jaane Tu" and "Aaya Re Toofan"—were released as singles on 31 January and 6 February 2025. The album was distributed by Sony Music India and released on 12 February at a music launch-cum-live concert held at the Nita Mukesh Ambani Cultural Centre in Mumbai. The soundtrack and score received mixed response, with criticism directed on the use of contemporary instruments and soundings in a period film resulting in it being unsuitable for the film's historical themes.

== Development ==
The film's musical score and soundtrack were composed by A. R. Rahman, who earlier collaborated with Laxman on Mimi (2021). Rahman received the offer to score for Chhaava, when he finished composing for Ponniyin Selvan: I and II. Though initially hesitant, Laxman admitted that the film was completely different to the two-part series and wanted a global sound to the story. Despite being musically driven, Rahman provided a subtle approach for the film, adding that "When people come out, they just feel the movie. They don't say how great the music is, they say, 'What a great movie, what a great performance.' That's what music should do. It should enhance in a subliminal way where everything is heightened — the action and the characters."

The first theme he wrote, was for the protagonist Chatrapati Sambhaji Maharaj (Kaushal), which he tuned after Utekar suggested a theme that emphasizes the king's glory. He composed multiple variations of the theme before the final version. The song "Jaane Tu" was also the first of the tunes that came, as "we went all around trying different ideas and then ultimately came back to this tune". The tune appears in multiple instances, while its purpose was signified in the climatic portions, where it becomes the voice of his wife coming back and embodied their telepathic spiritual relationship.

Rahman refrained from using any ideas when it comes for composing historical films, but to provide the story and visuals, a contemporary feel which would resonate with the current generation audiences.

== Release ==
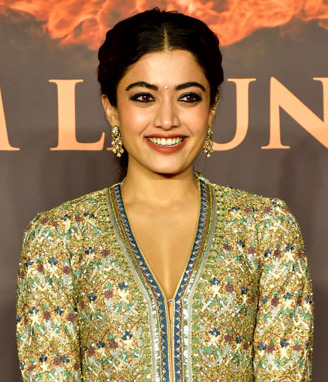
Rashmika Mandanna at the music launch event.

The album was preceded by the first single "Jaane Tu", which released on 31 January 2025. It is a romantic ballad picturized on Kaushal and Mandanna, and featured vocals by Arijit Singh. The second single titled "Aaya Re Toofan" was released on 6 February 2025. The film's music launch was held on 12 February 2025 at the Nita Mukesh Ambani Cultural Centre in Mumbai. The cast and crew felicitated the event, which also featured live performance of the songs by Rahman and his musical team. The album will be distributed in vinyl LP formats, by the music company Blisstainment with an expected release in March 2025.

== Track listing ==
No.	Title	Lyrics	Singer(s)	Length
1.	"Jaane Tu"	Irshad Kamil	Arijit Singh	4:44
2.	"Aaya Re Toofan"	Irshad Kamil, Kshitij Patwardhan	A. R. Rahman, Vaishali Samant	4:39
3.	"Zinda Rahey"	Irshad Kamil	Hiral Viradia, A. R. Rahman	5:08
4.	"Teri Chaahat"	Irshad Kamil	Jonita Gandhi, Seeta Qasemi	3:05
5.	"The Roar"	Irshad Kamil	MC Heam, Nakul Abhyankar	3:12
6.	"Rudra"	Kshitij Patwardhan	Nakul Abhyankar	3:00
7.	"The Crown"	Traditional	Mahsa Ahmadi, Nooshin Ghayoor	3:22
Total length:				27:10

== Reception ==
The music received mixed reception from critics and audiences, who noted Rahman's use of contemporary sounds being "out of place" for a period film set in the 17th century. Devesh Sharma of Filmfare noted "While AR Rahman's background score is typically masterful, the use of electric guitar in the midst of tense sequences, reminiscent of Wagner's Ride of the Valkyries, feels out of place in a period drama. A more culturally rooted score, using Indian tunes and instruments, would have better suited the historical setting." Prasanna D. Zore of Rediff.com criticised that "A R Rahman has become monotonous with his melodies after Lagaan." Nandini Ramnath of Scroll.in and Pratikshya Mishra of The Quint also remarked as "deafening" and "ill-fitting". Mishra further summarized that "in isolation, perhaps these tunes, loud as they are in the film, could work. But on screen, in a film set after 1680, it's so disjointed. This is a soundtrack for a modern film; not a period drama."

In contrast, Ganesh Aaglave of Firstpost said "A.R Rahman's music, BGM and scores blends beautifully with the narrative and enhances the storytelling." Nishad Thalaivappil of News18 wrote "The theme track of the film, Aaya Re Toofan, along with the two soulful melodies, Jaane Tu and Zinda Rahey, already makes this album a strong contender for the music accolades. However, the background score might just take you on a trip to Jodha Akbar, as it sounds slightly similar here and there."

== Personnel ==
- Music composed, produced, arranged and programmed by: A. R. Rahman
- Lyricists: Irshad Kamil, Kshitij Patwardhan
- Singers: A. R. Rahman, Arijit Singh, Vaishali Samant, Jonita Gandhi, Nakul Abhyankar, Hiral Viradia, MC Heam, Seeta Qasemie, Mahsa Ahmadi, Nooshin Ghayoor
- Backing vocals: Aanandi Joshi, Sumedha Karmahe, Aasa Singh, Sudeep Jaipurwale, Sana Aziz, Nakul Abhyankar, Sarthak Kalyani
- Flute: Naveen Kumar
- Bass guitar: Keith Peters
- Violin: Balaji
- Shehnai: Pratik Shrivastava
- Dholak: Sivamani
- Rhythm arranged and conducted by: Dipesh Varma, Kumaran Sivamani
- Percussions: Dipesh Varma, Shikhar Naad Qureshi, Vijay Jadhav, Ganesh Thorat, Rahul Rupawate, Adesh More, Siddharth Jadhav, Tushar Shirsath Tutar
- Strings: Budapest Scoring Orchestra
- Recording studio: Rottenblier Utca (Budapest)
- Conductor: Peter Illenyi, Dániel Erik Fülöp
- Session producer: Bálint Sapszon
- Recording engineer: Viktor Sabzo
- Librarian: Agnes Sapszon
- Score transcription: Samarth Srinivasan, Srikanth Krishna
- Indian representative: Balasubramanian G
- Music supervision and editing: Hiral Viradia
- Additional programming: Parag Chhabra, Japjisingh Valecha, Shubham Bhat, Sarthak Kalyani
- Studios: Panchathan Record Inn (Chennai), Panchathan Studios (Mumbai), Cafe Musica (Chennai)
- Senior engineers: Suresh Permal, Karthik Sekaran
- Recording engineers: Sreekanth Hariharan, Sarthak Kalyani, Sarath Santosh, Suryansh, Dilshaad Shabbir Shaikh, Nitish R Kumar, Vibin Sundar
- Assistant recording engineers: Aravind Crescendo, Sathish V Saravanan, Harshil Pathak, Naval Chikhliya
- Mixed and mastered by: Suresh Permal, Nitish R Kumar
- Head of technical services: Riyasdeen Riyan
- Musicians' coordinator: R Samidurai, Abdul Hayum

== Release history ==
Region	Date	Format(s)	Label	Ref.
Various	12 February 2025	Digital download; streaming	Sony Music India	
Various	March 2025	Vinyl	Sony Music India	
