= 1974 IFA Shield final =

- Event: 1974 IFA Shield
East Bengal	Mohun Bagan
1	0
- Date: 29 September 1974
- Venue: Mohun Bagan Ground, Kolkata, West Bengal

The 1974 IFA Shield final was the 78th final of the IFA Shield, the second oldest football competition in India, and was contested between Kolkata giants East Bengal and Mohun Bagan on 29 September 1974 at the Mohun Bagan Ground in Kolkata.

East Bengal won the final 1–0 to claim their 13th IFA Shield title. Subhash Bhowmick scored the only goal in the final as East Bengal lifted their third consecutive IFA Shield title.

== Route to the final ==
East Bengal		Round	Mohun Bagan	
Opponent	Result	Second Round Group League	Opponent	Result
Kalighat	2–2	Matchday 1	Premier Tyres	2–0
Mohammedan Sporting	3–0	Matchday 2	Abahani Krira Chakra	5–0
Opponent	Result	Knockout Stage	Opponent	Result
Abahani Krira Chakra	7–0	Semi–Final	Mohammedan Sporting	3–1

== Match ==
=== Summary ===
The IFA Shield final began at the Mohun Bagan Ground in Kolkata on 29 September 1974 in front of a packed crowd as two Kolkata giants East Bengal and Mohun Bagan faced each other in the Kolkata Derby. East Bengal started as the favorites as they were the defending champions from the last two editions and had already won the 1973 Calcutta Football League. The game started as expected, with East Bengal dominating the proceedings. Mohun Bagan custodian Prashanta Mitra made four terrific saves to keep the mariners in the game. The only goal of the game came in the fortieth minute when Mohammed Habib freed himself out wide from a short corner from Samaresh Chowdhury and put in a measured cross which was headed into the goal by Subhash Bhowmick. East Bengal managed to create some more chances in the second half but was denied by Prashanta Mitra. The scoreline remained the same until the full time as East Bengal lifted their third consecutive IFA Shield title and also managed to secure a third consecutive League and Shield double.

=== Details ===
29 September 1974
14:30 IST

East Bengal	1–0	Mohun Bagan
Bhowmick 40'

Mohun Bagan Ground, Kolkata
Attendance: 30,000 (est.)

East Bengal	Mohun Bagan

GK	(India) Biswajit Das
LB	(India) Kajal Dhali
CB	(India) Ashoke Banerjee
CB	(India) Shyamal Ghosh
RB	(India) Sudhir Karmakar
CM	(India) Gautam Sarkar
CM	(India) Samaresh Chowdhury (c)
RW	(India) Surajit Sengupta
LW	(India) Subhash Bhowmick
ST	(India) Mohammed Habib
ST	(India) Mohammed Akbar
Head Coach:
(India) P. K. Banerjee

GK	(India) Prashanta Mitra
RB	(India) Ajit Chakraborty
CB	(India) Syed Nayeemuddin
CB	(India) Nimai Goswami
LB	(India) Bijoy Dikpati
CM	(India) Mohon Singh
CM	(India) Prasun Banerjee
RW	(India) Narayanswami Ulaganathan	Substituted off
LW	(India) Swapan Sengupta (c)
ST	(India) Sukalyan Ghosh Dastidar	Substituted off
ST	(India) Poongam Kannan
Substitutes:
RW	(India) Sisir Guha Dastidar	Substituted in
ST	(India) Sankar Banerjee	Substituted in
Head coach:
(India) Amal Dutta

Match rules

- 90 minutes.
- Joint winners if both finals ends in a draw

== See also ==
- IFA Shield Finals
