= Moshe Leon =

Israeli footballer

Moshe Leon משה ליאון
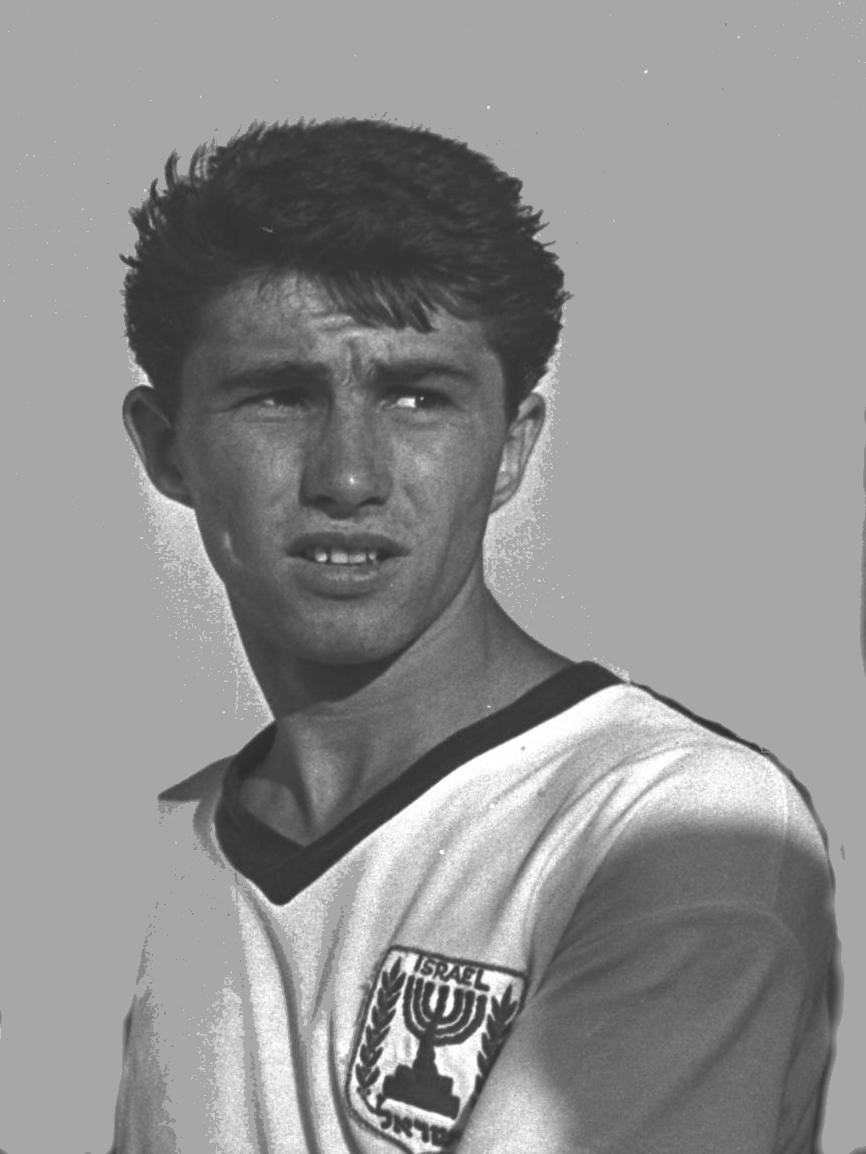

Personal information
- Date of birth: January 9, 1944 (age 82)
- Place of birth: Ruse, Kingdom of Bulgaria
- Position: Defender

Youth career
- Maccabi Jaffa

Senior career*
Years	Team	Apps	(Gls)
1961–1984	Maccabi Jaffa	401	(15)
1966–1970	→ Westview Apollon (loan)		

International career
1962–1977	Israel	26	(1)
- * Club domestic league appearances and goals

Moshe "Mutzi" Leon (Hebrew: משה "מוצי" ליאון; born January 9, 1944) is a former Israeli international footballer of Bulgarian descent. Leon is regarded as the greatest player in the history of Maccabi Jaffa, there he played for over 20 seasons.

On June 3, 1964, He scored the first goal in the final game of the 1964 AFC Asian Cup, whom Israel won 2–1 against South Korea.

In 1998, he was introduced into the "Israeli Football Hall of Fame".

In 2008, in Israel's 60th anniversary, he was chosen by the Israeli Football Association as "The Best Left-back in Israel's History".

== Honours ==
- AFC Asian Cup
  - Winner (1): 1964
- Israeli Premier League
  - Runner-up (3): 1961–62, 1963–64, 1976–77
- Liga Artzit
  - Winner (1): 1970–71
