= Yosef Mahalal =

Israeli footballer (1939–2023)

Yosef Mahalal יוסף מהלל
Personal information
- Date of birth: 25 December 1939
- Place of birth: Jerusalem, Mandatory Palestine
- Date of death: 4 October 2023 (aged 83)
- Position: Midfielder

Youth career
- Bnei Yehuda

Senior career*
Years	Team	Apps	(Gls)
1954–1969	Bnei Yehuda		
1969–1970	Hapoel Ashkelon		
1970–1971	Hapoel Tzafririm Holon		
1971–1973	Hapoel Yehud		

International career
1962–1965	Israel	5	(2)
- * Club domestic league appearances and goals

Yosef Mahalal (Hebrew: יוסף מהלל; 25 December 1939 – 4 October 2023) was an Israeli footballer who played as a midfielder. He played in five matches for the Israel national team from 1962 to 1965. Mahalal died on 4 October 2023, at the age of 83.
