= Yohai Aharoni =

Israeli footballer

Yohai Aharoni יוחאי אהרוני
Personal information
- Date of birth: 8 June 1943 (age 83)
- Position: Right winger

Youth career
- Hapoel Petah Tikva
- Hapoel Mahane Yehuda

Senior career*
Years	Team	Apps	(Gls)
196?–1968	Hapoel Mahane Yehuda		
1969–1970	Hapoel Petah Tikva	18	
1970–1971	Beitar Tel Aviv		

International career
1964–1965	Israel national team	5	(1)

Managerial career
- Hapoel Mahane Yehuda
- Hapoel Jaljulia
- Hapoel Aliyah Kfar Saba
- * Club domestic league appearances and goals

Yohai Aharoni (Hebrew: יוחאי אהרוני; born 8 June 1943) is an Israeli former football player and coach who played as a right winger. He is best known for playing in Hapoel Mahane Yehuda and Hapoel Petah Tikva in Israel's prime league. On the Israel national team, Aharoni contributed to Israel's only Asia Cup victory.

== Club career ==
On 30 September 1967, Aharoni scored the first goal in Hapoel Mahane Yehuda's 5–2 defeat of Hapoel Ramat Gan in Israel's first tier of that era, the Liga Leumit. In January 1968, Hapoel Petah Tikva pressured Mahane Yehuda, through the Petah Tikva Worker's Council of Israel's largest trade union, to trade Aharoni against three specific players of their own. Mahane Yehuda refused the offer and Aharoni went on quarantine so he could be released from his club.

After the quarantine, in 1969–70, Aharoni had 18 caps for Hapoel Petah Tikva, 17 of which were in the opening squad. His Hapoel Petah Tikva debut was on 18 October 1969, in a 0–0 draw against Hapoel Haifa. In the summer of 1971, after a season at Beitar Tel Aviv, he quit his playing career due to an injury.

== International career ==
Aharoni earned five caps for the Israel national team, scoring one goal against India in the 1964 AFC Asian Cup. His first cap was on 26 May 1964 against the Hong Kong national team, a game that Israel won 1–0. His last cap was a friendly game against the Netherlands on 26 January 1965, ending in a 1–0 loss for Israel.

== Managerial career ==
After his active playing career, Yohai Aharoni was a manager for Hapoel Mahane Yehuda, Hapoel Jaljulia, and Hapoel Aliyah Kfar Saba. He also coached in Rosh HaAyin.

== Legacy ==
In 2021 Aharoni was included in the Star Boulevard of Hapoel Mahane Yehuda, highlighting 12 footballers who starred for the club while it played in Israel's prime league.
