= Gideon Tish =

Israeli footballer (1939–2026)

Personal information
- Date of birth: 13 October 1939
- Place of birth: Tel Aviv, Mandatory Palestine
- Date of death: 21 April 2026 (aged 86)
- Position: Midfielder

Youth career
- Hapoel Tel Aviv

Senior career*
Years	Team	Apps	(Gls)
1955–1966	Hapoel Tel Aviv		
1966–1968	Hapoel Herzliya		
1968–1969	Hapoel Tel Aviv		

International career
1958–1964	Israel	33	(1)

Managerial career
- 1966–1968: Hapoel Herzliya (player-manager)
- * Club domestic league appearances and goals

Gideon Tish (Hebrew: גדעון טיש; 13 October 1939 – 21 April 2026) was an Israeli footballer who played as a midfielder.

== Career ==
In the 1950s, Tish spent most of his career at Hapoel Tel Aviv, scoring 55 goals which places him as one of the greatest scorers in the history of the club.

== Death ==
Tish died on 21 April 2026, at the age of 86.

== Honours ==
Hapoel Tel Aviv

- Israeli Premier League: 1956–57, 1965–66, 1968–69
- Israel State Cup: 1960–61
- Footballer of the Year in Israel: 1963
- AFC Asian Cup: 1964
