= D. Ethiraj =

Indian footballer (1934–2020)

Personal information
- Full name: Dharmalingam Ethiraj
- Date of birth: 1 July 1934
- Date of death: 11 December 2020 (aged 86)
- Place of death: Bangalore, India

Senior career*
Years	Team	Apps	(Gls)
- EME Secunderabad
1957–1963	MEG Bangalore		
1958–1962	Services		
1962–1966	Mysore		

International career
- India
Medal record
Men's football
Representing India
Asian Games
Gold medal – first place	1962 Jakarta	Team
- * Club domestic league appearances and goals

Dharmalingam Ethiraj (1 July 1934 – 11 December 2020) was an Indian footballer who represented India national team at the 1962 Asian Games and won a gold. He was the oldest player in the young yet talented Indian Team. Ethiraj joined the Indian Army in 1948 and served in the Madras Sappers. He played for Mysore and Services in the Santosh Trophy. He was the top scorer in the 1961 Santosh Trophy.

He died in December 2020 at the age of 86.

== Honours ==
India

- Asian Games Gold medal: 1962

Services

- Santosh Trophy: 1960–61

MEG Bangalore

- DCM Trophy runner-up: 1959
