= Sukumar Samajpati =

Indian footballer (born 1939)

Personal information
- Date of birth: 1939 (age 86–87)
- Place of birth: Pabna, Bengal Presidency, British India (present-day in Rajshahi Division, Bangladesh)
- Position: Forward

Senior career*
Years	Team	Apps	(Gls)
- Mohun Bagan
	East Bengal		(45)

International career
- India
Medal record
Men's football
Representing India
AFC Asian Cup
Runner-up	1964 Israel	Team
- * Club domestic league appearances and goals

Sukumar Samajpati (born 1939) was an Indian professional footballer. He played predominantly as a forward, and was part of the Indian squad that finished runners-up at the 1964 AFC Asian Cup in Israel.

== Career ==
Studied at the University of Calcutta, Samajpati played for Chuni Goswami led Mohun Bagan AC in 1960, before switching to East Bengal Club in domestic football. In Mohun Bagan, he was mentored by club legend Balaidas Chatterjee and participated in foreign tours. He captained the "red and gold brigade" in 1965–66. During his playing days in East Bengal, he was guided by Sushil Bhattacharya, club's first head coach. He scored overall 46 goals with East Bengal between 1961 and 1968.

With India, he scored a goal in their 3–1 win over Hong Kong at the 1964 AFC Asian Cup.

== Honours ==
Mohun Bagan

- Durand Cup: 1960
- Calcutta Football League: 1960
- IFA Shield: 1960

India

- AFC Asian Cup runners-up: 1964

Individual

- East Bengal "Lifetime Achievement Award": 2011

== See also ==
- List of East Bengal Club captains
- History of the India national football team

== Bibliography ==
- Kapadia, Novy (2017). Barefoot to Boots: The Many Lives of Indian Football. Penguin Random House. ISBN 978-0-143-42641-7.
- Martinez, Dolores; Mukharjiim, Projit B (2009). Football: From England to the World: The Many Lives of Indian Football. Routledge. ISBN 978-1-138-88353-6. Archived from the original on 2 July 2022.
- Nath, Nirmal (2011). History of Indian Football: Upto 2009–10. Readers Service. ISBN 9788187891963. Archived from the original on 22 July 2022.
- Dineo, Paul; Mills, James (2001). Soccer in South Asia: Empire, Nation, Diaspora. London, United Kingdom: Frank Cass Publishers. ISBN 978-0-7146-8170-2. Archived from the original on 25 July 2022.
