= Arumainayagam =

Indian footballer

Personal information
- Full name: Isaiah Arumainayagam
- Date of birth: 6 July 1942 (age 84)
- Place of birth: Bangalore, Mysore State
- Height: 5 ft 2 in (1.57 m)
- Position: Inside forward

Senior career*
Years	Team	Apps	(Gls)
1958–1959	Binny Mills		
1959–1961	Hindustan Aircraft		
1961–1968	Mohun Bagan		

International career
- India

Managerial career
- 1994: India Women
Medal record
Men's football
Representing India
Asian Games
Gold medal – first place	1962 Jakarta	Team
AFC Asian Cup
Runner-up	1964 Israel	Team
- * Club domestic league appearances and goals

Isaiah Arumainayagam (6 July 1942 – ) is an Indian former footballer. He represented India internationally. He was awarded the Arjuna Award for Lifetime Achievement in 2025, which was presented to him in November 2026.

== Playing career ==
Arumainayagam was part of the India national team during the golden era of the country's football under coaching of Syed Abdul Rahim. He was also part of the Indian team that achieved second place at the 1964 AFC Asian Cup in Israel. He also participated in the 1962 Jakarta Asian Games which India won.

Arumainayagam played for Mysore for three years from 1958. In the 1961 Santosh Trophy in Calicut, he was noticed by the scouts of Mohun Bagan who signed him. In Mohun Bagan AC, he played with Jarnail Singh, Chuni Goswami and others in the 1960s.

== Managerial career ==
Arumainayagam was the head coach of the India women's national team, when India's first international women's football tournament, named Jayalalitha Gold Cup was held at Chennai in 1994.

== Honours ==
Mohun Bagan

- Durand Cup: 1963, 1964, 1965
- IFA Shield: 1961, 1962, 1967
- Rovers Cup: 1966
- Calcutta Football League: 1962, 1963, 1964, 1965

India

- Asian Games Gold medal: 1962
- AFC Asian Cup runners-up: 1964
- Merdeka Tournament third-place: 1966

Individual

- Mohun Bagan Ratna: 2014
- Arjuna Award: 2025

== See also ==
- History of Indian football

== Bibliography ==
- Kapadia, Novy (2017). Barefoot to Boots: The Many Lives of Indian Football. Penguin Random House. ISBN 978-0-143-42641-7.
- Martinez, Dolores; Mukharjiim, Projit B (2009). Football: From England to the World: The Many Lives of Indian Football. Routledge. ISBN 978-1-138-88353-6. Archived from the original on 2 July 2022.
- Nath, Nirmal (2011). History of Indian Football: Upto 2009–10. Readers Service. ISBN 9788187891963. Archived from the original on 22 July 2022.
- Dineo, Paul; Mills, James (2001). Soccer in South Asia: Empire, Nation, Diaspora. London, United Kingdom: Frank Cass Publishers. ISBN 978-0-7146-8170-2. Archived from the original on 25 July 2022.
- "Triumphs and Disasters: The Story of Indian Football, 1889—2000" (PDF). Archived from the original (PDF) on 13 August 2012.
- Majumdar, Boria, Bandyopadhyay, Kausik (2006). Goalless: The Story of a Unique Footballing Nation. Penguin India. ISBN 9780670058747.
- Majumdar, Boria; Bandyopadhyay, Kausik (2006). A Social History Of Indian Football: Striving To Score. Routledge. ISBN 9780415348355. Archived from the original on 29 June 2021.
- Basu, Jaydeep (2003). Stories from Indian Football. UBS Publishers' Distributors. ISBN 9788174764546. Archived from the original on 11 October 2022.
