= Pradyut Barman =

Indian footballer

Personal information
- Date of birth: 1935
- Place of birth: Calcutta, Bengal, British India
- Date of death: 29 October 2016 (aged 81)
- Place of death: Kolkata, West Bengal, India
- Position: Goalkeeper

Senior career*
Years	Team	Apps	(Gls)
1955	Uttarpara Bhadrakali AC		
1957	Wari		
1957–1958	Eastern Railway		
1958–1963	East Bengal		
1964–1968	Mohun Bagan		

International career
- India
Medal record
Men's football
Representing India
Asian Games
Gold medal – first place	1962 Jakarta	Team
- * Club domestic league appearances and goals

Pradyut Barman was an Indian footballer, known for his goalkeeping brilliance. He was part of the team that won the gold medal at the 1962 Asian Games at Jakarta. He played for Eastern Railway and Mohun Bagan in domestic tournaments.

== Honours ==
India

- Asian Games Gold medal: 1962
- Merdeka Tournament third-place: 1965

East Bengal

- IFA Shield: 1958
- Rovers Cup: 1960
- DCM Trophy: 1960

Bengal

- Santosh Trophy: 1958–59, 1959–60

Railway

- Santosh Trophy: 1961–62

Eastern Railway

- Calcutta Football League: 1958

Mohun Bagan

- Calcutta Football League: 1964, 1965
- Durand Cup: 1964, 1965
- Rovers Cup: 1964, 1968
