= 1964 AFC Asian Cup =

Football tournament in Asia

Asian Cup Israel 1964 גביע אסיה בכדורגל 1964
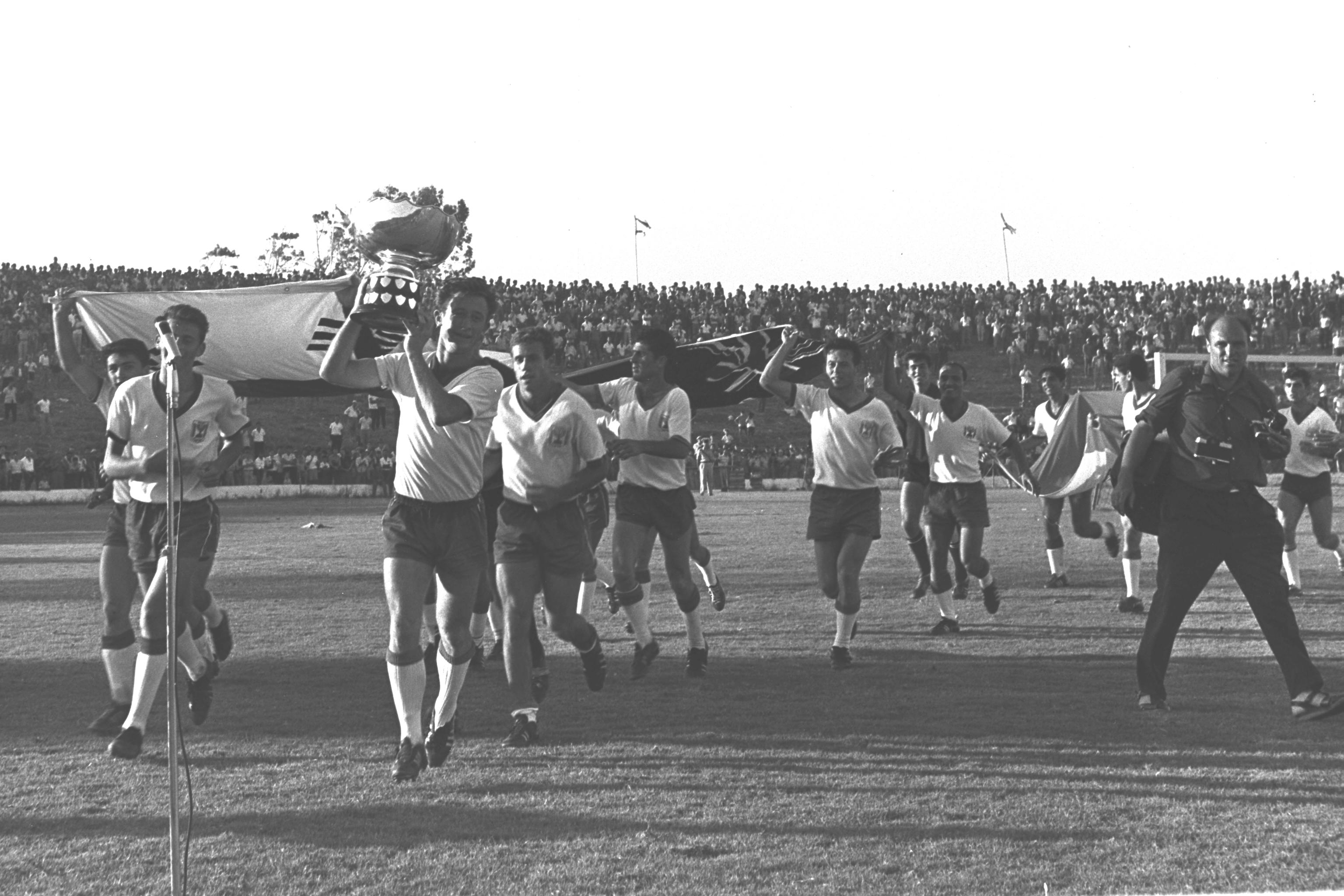
- Israel holds the Asian Cup after winning it

Tournament details
- Host country: Israel
- Dates: 26 May – 3 June
- Teams: 4
- Venues: 4 (in 4 host cities)

Final positions
- Champions: Israel (1st title)
- Runners-up: India
- Third place: South Korea
- Fourth place: Hong Kong

Tournament statistics
- Matches played: 6
- Goals scored: 13 (2.17 per match)
- Attendance: 99,000 (16,500 per match)
- Top scorer(s): (India) Inder Singh (Israel) Mordechai Spiegler (2 goals each)

The 1964 AFC Asian Cup was the 3rd edition of the men's AFC Asian Cup, a quadrennial international football tournament organised by the Asian Football Confederation (AFC). The finals were held in Israel from 26 May to 3 June 1964.

The tournament used a round-robin system which had to be increased in size to five teams, with the winners from the Western, Central 1 and 2 and Eastern zones, as well as the host nation (Israel) competing for the title. Eleven of the 17 nations withdrew from qualification (Note: Nations that withdrew: Afghanistan, Cambodia, Ceylon (Sri Lanka), Indonesia, Iran, Japan, Myanmar, Pakistan, Philippines, Republic of China, and Singapore.) resulting in only one zone (a combined Central 1 and 2) playing any qualifying matches. The two remaining teams from the Western and Eastern zones respectively qualified uncontested.

The final tournament was subsequently a four-team competition, the same format as previous editions, with Israel winning the title with a perfect record of three wins. In keeping with previous editions of the tournament, all the matches were only 80 minutes in duration.

== Venues ==
Ramat Gan	1964 AFC Asian Cup is located in Israel	Tel Aviv
Ramat Gan Stadium	1964 AFC Asian Cup is located in Israel	Bloomfield Stadium
Capacity: 51,000	1964 AFC Asian Cup is located in Israel	Capacity: 22,000
Haifa	1964 AFC Asian Cup is located in Israel	Jerusalem
Kiryat Eliezer Stadium	1964 AFC Asian Cup is located in Israel	Hebrew University Stadium
Capacity: 17,000	1964 AFC Asian Cup is located in Israel	Capacity: 16,000

== Qualification ==
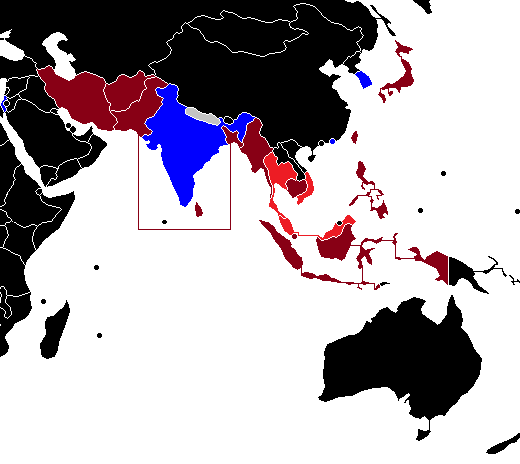
Qualified Did not qualify Withdrew before playing any matches Did not enter Not an AFC member

Team	Qualified as	Qualified on	Previous appearance
Israel	Hosts	N/A	2 (1956, 1960)
Hong Kong	Central Zone winners	14 December 1963	1 (1956)
South Korea	Eastern zone winners (automatically qualified)	1963	2 (1956, 1960)
India	Western Zone winners (automatically qualified)	1963	0 (debut)

== Results ==
Pos	Team	Pld	W	D	L	GF	GA	GD	Pts	Qualification
1	Israel (H)	3	3	0	0	5	1	+4	6	Champions
2	India	3	2	0	1	5	3	+2	4	Runners-up
3	South Korea	3	1	0	2	2	4	−2	2	Third place
4	Hong Kong	3	0	0	3	1	5	−4	0	Fourth place

Source: RSSSF
(H) Hosts

All times are Israel Standard Time (UTC+2).

26 May 1964
16:30

Israel	1–0	Hong Kong
Spiegler 76'

Ramat Gan Stadium, Ramat Gan
Attendance: 25,000
Referee: Patrick Nice (Malaysia)

27 May 1964
16:30

South Korea	0–2	India
		Appalraju 2'; I. Singh 57'

Kiryat Eliezer Stadium, Haifa
Attendance: 7,000
Referee: Davoud Nassiri (Iran)

29 May 1964
16:00

Israel	2–0	India
Spiegler 29' (pen.); Aharoni 76'

Bloomfield Stadium, Tel Aviv
Attendance: 20,000
Referee: Li Pak Tung (Malaysia)

30 May 1964
16:30

South Korea	1–0	Hong Kong
Park Seung-ok 74'

Hebrew University Stadium, Jerusalem
Attendance: 7,000
Referee: Pisit Ngarampanich (Thailand)

2 June 1964
16:30

India	3–1	Hong Kong
I. Singh 45'; Samajapati 60'; Goswami 77'		Cheung Yiu Kwok 39'

Bloomfield Stadium, Tel Aviv
Attendance: 5,000
Referee: Patrick Nice (Malaysia)

3 June 1964
16:00

South Korea	1–2	Israel
Lee Soon-myung 79'		Leon 20'; Tish 38'

Ramat Gan Stadium, Ramat Gan
Attendance: 35,000
Referee: Davoud Nassiri (Iran)

== Winners ==
1964 AFC Asian Cup winners

Israel
First title

== Goalscorers ==
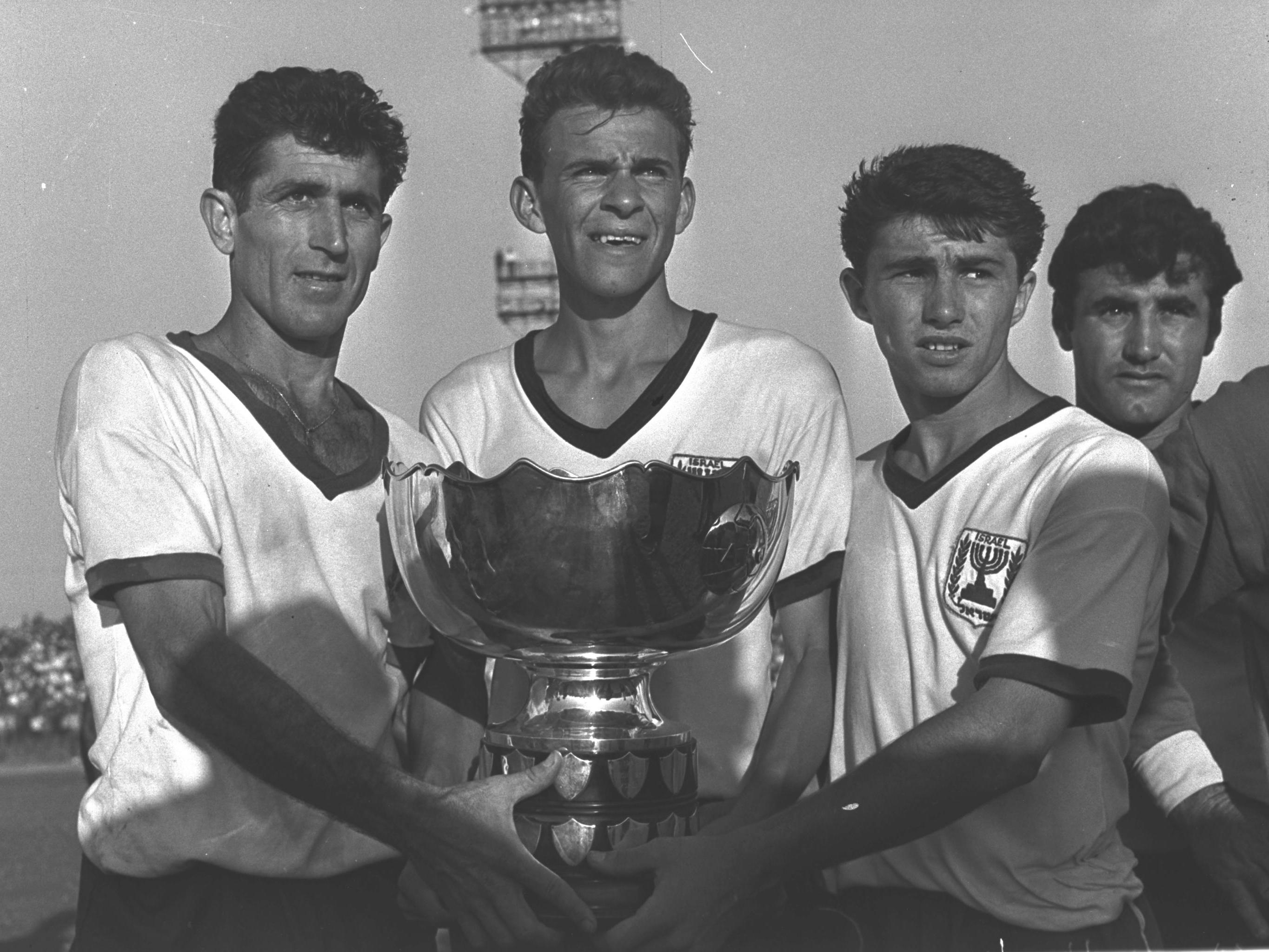
Israeli teammates (Mordechai Spiegler in the middle) holding the 1964 AFC Asian Cup after beating South Korea in the final round

With two goals, Inder Singh and Mordechai Spiegler were the top scorers in the tournament. In total, 13 goals were scored by 11 different players, with none of them credited as own goal.

2 goals

- (India) Inder Singh
- (Israel) Mordechai Spiegler

1 goal

- (Hong Kong) Cheung Yiu Kwok
- (India) K. Appalaraju
- (India) Chuni Goswami
- (India) Sukumar Samajpati
- (Israel) Yohai Aharoni
- (Israel) Moshe Leon
- (Israel) Gideon Tish
- (South Korea) Park Seung-ok
- (South Korea) Lee Soon-Myung
