= IFA Shield =

Association football competition in India

IFA Shield আইএফএ শিল্ড
- Organiser(s): Indian Football Association (West Bengal)
- Founded: 1893; 133 years ago
- Region: India (primarily West Bengal)
- Teams: Various
- Related competitions: Women's IFA Shield
- Current champions: Mohun Bagan (22nd title)
- Most championships: East Bengal (29 titles)
- Broadcaster: FanCode
- Website: ifawb.in
- 2026

The IFA Shield is a football competition organized by the Indian Football Association, the football governing body in the Indian state of West Bengal. The IFA came into existence in 1893, and was named after the association. The IFA Shield tournament was started in the same year. It is the third oldest football tournament in India, after Durand Cup and Trades Cup, and is among the oldest football competitions in the world.

== History ==
The royal houses of Patiala and Cooch Behar, A.A. Apcar of Armenian Club and J Sutherland of Dalhousie AC had financially contributed for the inception of the Shield. The coveted shield was designed by Walter Locke & Co. (Calcutta) and made by Messrs Elkington & Co. (London).

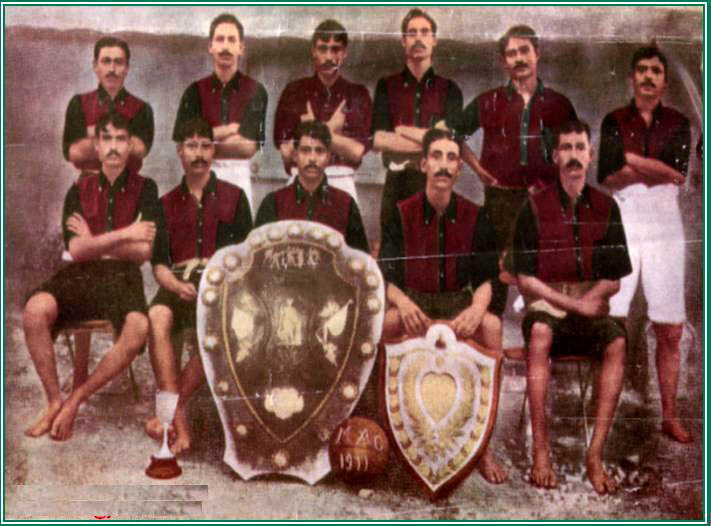
Mohun Bagan, the first all-Indian side to lift the IFA Shield.

During the initial years of the competition, the IFA Shield was dominated by British Army teams and the Royal Irish Rifles defeated W.D.R.A. to lift the first IFA Shield in 1893. However, their stranglehold over the Shield was broken in 1911, when Mohun Bagan became the first all-Indian side to win the IFA Shield by defeating East Yorkshire Regiment by 2–1. That was a historic moment for Indian football as well the struggle for independence, as the natives beat the Englishmen in their own game. While the Royal Irish Rifles remains the most successful British Army side with 5 titles, East Bengal Club has won the IFA Shield a record 29 times.

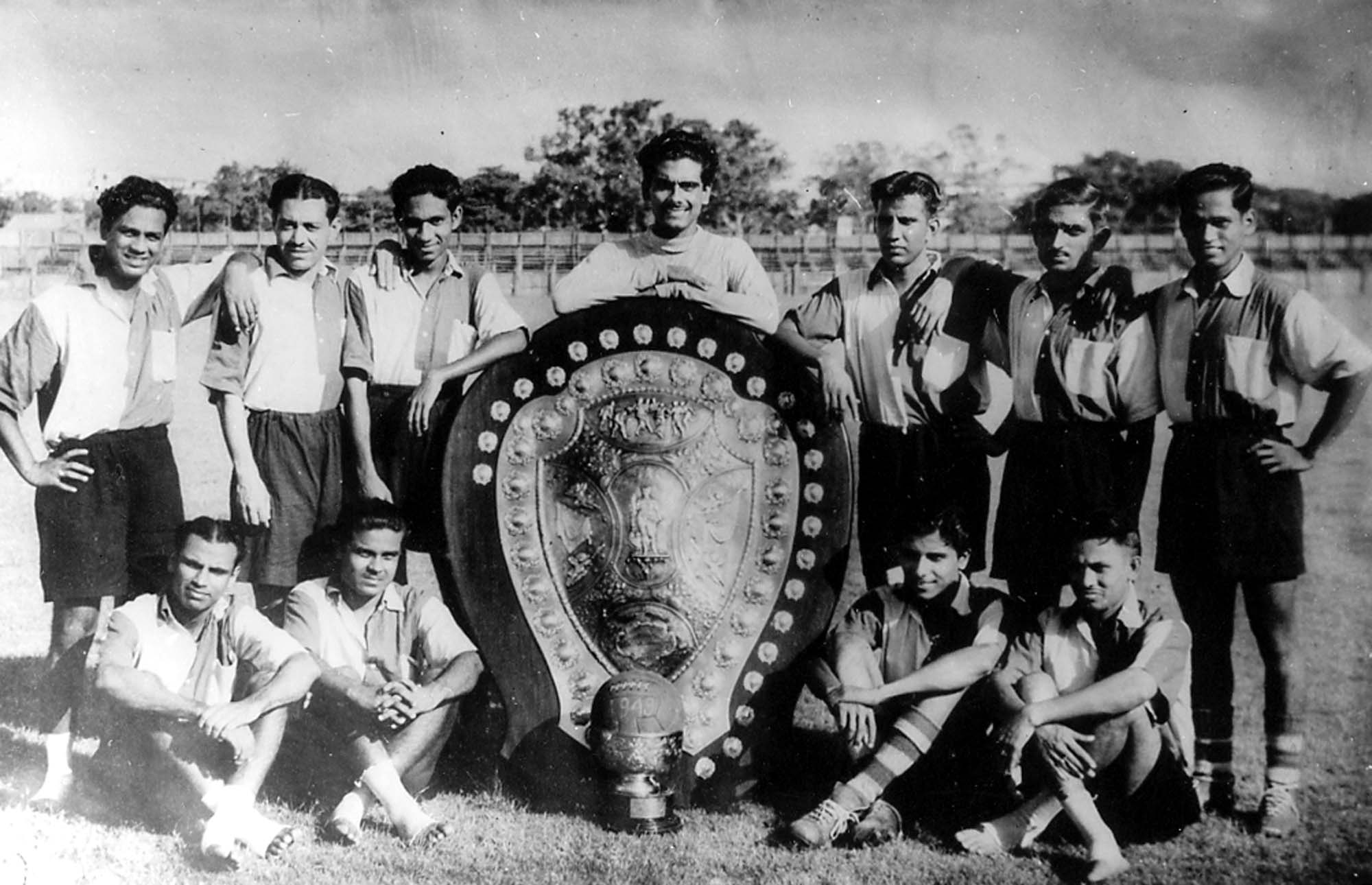
The 1949 IFA Shield won by East Bengal, the most successful club in the tournament's history.

From 2015 to 2018, the IFA Shield was designed as a youth tournament wherein youth teams of all divisions were allowed to participate. The decision was taken by IFA due to busy schedule of AIFF which includes Indian Super League, I-League, I-League 2, State leagues and Super Cup among others. In 2020, the tournament was once again organised as a senior event.

== Results ==
=== Pre-independence era (1893–1946) ===
Year	Winner	Score	Runner-up	Notes
1893	(United Kingdom) Royal Irish Rifles	1–0	(United Kingdom) W.D.R.A.	
1894	(United Kingdom) Royal Irish Rifles	2–0	(United Kingdom) Rifle Brigade	
1895	(United Kingdom) Royal Welch Fusiliers	1–0	(United Kingdom) King's Shropshire Light Infantry	
1896	(British Raj) Calcutta	3–0	(United Kingdom) King's Shropshire Light Infantry	
1897	(British Raj) Dalhousie	4–0	(United Kingdom) 31st Field Battalion	
1898	(United Kingdom) Gloucestershire Regiment	1–0	(United Kingdom) 42nd Highlanders	
1899	(United Kingdom) South Lancashire Regiment	2–0	(British Raj) Barrackpore Artillery	
1900	(British Raj) Calcutta	0–0; 6–0	(British Raj) Dalhousie	
1901	(United Kingdom) Royal Irish Rifles	4–0	(United Kingdom) Black Watch	
1902	(United Kingdom) 93rd Highlanders	3–0	(British Raj) Dalhousie	
1903	(British Raj) Calcutta	0–0; 1–1; 2–1	(United Kingdom) King's Own Scottish Borderers	
1904	(British Raj) Calcutta	1–0	(United Kingdom) King's Own Royal Regiment	
1905	(British Raj) Dalhousie	4–3	(British Raj) Calcutta	
1906	(British Raj) Calcutta	1–0	(United Kingdom) Highland Light Infantry	
1907	(United Kingdom) Highland Light Infantry	0–0; 1–0	(British Raj) Calcutta	
1908	(United Kingdom) Gordon Highlanders	2–0	(British Raj) Calcutta Customs	
1909	(United Kingdom) Gordon Highlanders	0–0; 3–0	(British Raj) Calcutta Customs	
1910	(United Kingdom) Gordon Highlanders	0–0; 2–0	(British Raj) Calcutta	
1911	(British Raj) Mohun Bagan	2–1	(United Kingdom) East Yorkshire Regiment	^{3}
1912	(United Kingdom) Royal Irish Rifles	1–0	(United Kingdom) Black Watch	
1913	(United Kingdom) Royal Irish Rifles	2–0	(United Kingdom) 91st Highlanders	
1914	(United Kingdom) King's Own Royal Regiment	1–0	(British Raj) Calcutta	
1915	(British Raj) Calcutta	0–0; 3–0	(British Raj) Calcutta Customs	
1916	(United Kingdom) North Staffordshire Regiment	2–1	(British Raj) Calcutta	
1917	(United Kingdom) 10th Battalion, Middlesex Regiment	2–0	(United Kingdom) Brecknockshire Battalion	
1918	(British Raj) Training Reserve Battalion	1–0	(British Raj) Signal Service Depot	
1919	(United Kingdom) 1st Battalion of Brecknockshire	3–1	(British Raj) Calcutta	
1920	(United Kingdom) Black Watch	2–0	(British Raj) Kumartuli	
1921	(United Kingdom) 3rd Battalion of Brecknockshire	3–1	(British Raj) Calcutta	
1922	(British Raj) Calcutta	1–0	(British Raj) Dalhousie	
1923	(British Raj) Calcutta	3–0	(British Raj) Mohun Bagan	
1924	(British Raj) Calcutta	5–1	(United Kingdom) 23rd Brigade of Royal Engineers Association	
1925	(United Kingdom) 2nd Battalion of Royal Scots Fusiliers	5–1	(United Kingdom) Cheshire Regiment	
1926	(United Kingdom) Sherwood Foresters	5–1	(United Kingdom) Cheshire Regiment	
1927	(United Kingdom) Sherwood Foresters	2–0	(British Raj) Dalhousie	
1928	(United Kingdom) Sherwood Foresters	2–0	(British Raj) Dalhousie	
1929	(United Kingdom) 2nd Battalion Royal Ulster Rifles	2–0	(British Raj) Rangoon Customs	
1930	(United Kingdom) Seaforth Highlanders	3–0	(United Kingdom) Royal Regiment	
1931	(United Kingdom) Highland Light Infantry	1–1; 2–1	(United Kingdom) Durham Light Infantry	
1932	(United Kingdom) 2nd Battalion Essex Regiment	2–1	(United Kingdom) Seaforth Highlanders	
1933	(United Kingdom) Duke of Cornwall's Light Infantry	2–1	(United Kingdom) King's Royal Rifles	
1934	Tournament declared void ( (United Kingdom) King's Royal Rifles and (United Kingdom) Durham Light Infantry: 2–2)			^{4}
1935	(United Kingdom) East Yorkshire Regiment	1–0	(United Kingdom) Royal Regiment	
1936	(British Raj) Mohammedan	0–0; 0–0; 2–1	(British Raj) Calcutta	
1937	(British Raj) 6th Fire Brigade	4–1	(British Raj) Police	
1938	(United Kingdom) East Yorkshire Regiment	1–1; 1–1; 2–0	(British Raj) Mohammedan	
1939	(British Raj) Police	2–1	(British Raj) Calcutta Customs	
1940	(British Raj) Aryan	4–1	(British Raj) Mohun Bagan	
1941	(British Raj) Mohammedan	2–0	(United Kingdom) King's Own Scottish Borderers	
1942	(British Raj) Mohammedan	1–0	(British Raj) East Bengal	
1943	(British Raj) East Bengal	3–0	(British Raj) Police	
1944	(British Raj) Eastern Bengal Railway	1–0	(British Raj) East Bengal	
1945	(British Raj) East Bengal	1–0	(British Raj) Mohun Bagan	
1946	Not held			^{1}

=== Post-independence era (1947–present) ===
Year	Winner	Score	Runner-up	Notes
1947	Mohun Bagan	1–0	East Bengal	
1948	Mohun Bagan	1–1; 2–1	Bhawanipore	
1949	East Bengal	2–0	Mohun Bagan	
1950	East Bengal	3–0	Services	
1951	East Bengal	0–0; 2–0	Mohun Bagan	
1952	Tournament declared void (Mohun Bagan and Rajasthan Club: 0–0; 2–2)			
1953	Indian Culture League	0–0; 0–0; 1–1	East Bengal	^{5}
1954	Mohun Bagan	1–0	Hyderabad Sporting	
1955	Rajasthan Club	0–0; 1–0	Aryan	
1956	Mohun Bagan	4–0	Aryan	
1957	Mohammedan	3–0	Railways SC	
1958	East Bengal	1–1; 1–0	Mohun Bagan	
1959	Abandoned due to dispute over date of finals			
1960	Mohun Bagan	1–0	Indian Navy	
1961	East Bengal and Mohun Bagan	0–0	–	^{2}
1962	Mohun Bagan	3–1	Hyderabad XI	
1963	Bengal Nagpur Railway	1–0	Mohammedan	
1964	Tournament declared void (Mohun Bagan and East Bengal: 1–1)			
1965	East Bengal	1–0	Mohun Bagan	
1966	East Bengal	1–0	Bengal Nagpur Railway	
1967	Tournament declared void (Mohun Bagan and East Bengal: 0–0)			
1968	Abandoned due to court injunction			
1969	Mohun Bagan	3–1	East Bengal	
1970	East Bengal	1–0	(Iran) PAS Tehran	
1971	Mohammedan	2–0	Tollygunge Agragami	
1972	East Bengal	0–0; 0–1	Mohun Bagan	^{6}
1973	East Bengal	3–1	(North Korea) Pyongyang	
1974	East Bengal	1–0	Mohun Bagan	
1975	East Bengal	5–0	Mohun Bagan	
1976	East Bengal; Mohun Bagan	0–0	–	^{2}
1977	Mohun Bagan	1–0	East Bengal	
1978	Mohun Bagan and (Soviet Union) Ararat Yerevan	2–2	–	^{2}
1979	Mohun Bagan	1–0	East Bengal	
1980	Tournament abandoned			
1981	Mohun Bagan and East Bengal	2–2	–	^{2}
1982	Mohun Bagan	2–1	Mohammedan	
1983	East Bengal and Aryan	0–0	–	^{2}
1984	East Bengal	1–0	Mohun Bagan	
1985	(Uruguay) Peñarol	1–0	(Soviet Union) Shakhtar Donetsk	
1986	East Bengal	0–0 (4–2 p)	Mohun Bagan	
1987	Mohun Bagan	1–0	Punjab Police	
1988	Not held			^{1}
1989	Mohun Bagan	1–0	Tata Football Academy	
1990	East Bengal	1–0	Mohammedan	^{7}
1991	East Bengal	3–1	Army XI	
1992	Not held			^{1}
1993	(Uzbekistan) Pakhtakor Tashkent	1–1 (5–4 p)	(Kazakhstan) Irtysh Pavlodar	
1994	East Bengal	2–1	Mohun Bagan	
1995	East Bengal	1–1 (3–1 p)	(Bangladesh) Mohammedan Dhaka	
1996	JCT	1–0	(Iraq) Al-Karkh	
1997	East Bengal	3–2	Kochin	
1998	Mohun Bagan	2–1	East Bengal	
1999	Mohun Bagan	1–0	Tollygunge Agragami	
2000	East Bengal	1–1 (4–1 p)	Mohun Bagan	
2001	East Bengal	1–0	(Brazil) Palmeiras B	^{8}
2002	East Bengal	0–0 (5–4 p)	Churchill Brothers	
2003	Mohun Bagan	0–0 (5–3 p)	East Bengal	
2004	(Myanmar) Finance and Revenue	1–1 (4–2 p)	Mohun Bagan	
2005	(Germany) Bayern Munich II	5–1	Eveready	
2006	Mahindra United	1–0	Mohun Bagan	
2007	Not held			^{1}
2008	Mahindra United	3–1	(South Africa) Santos	
2009	Churchill Brothers	2–0	Mohun Bagan	
2010	Not held			^{1}
2011	Churchill Brothers	2–1	Mohun Bagan	
2012	East Bengal	4–2	Prayag United	
2013	Prayag United	1–0	East Bengal	
2014	Mohammedan	1–1 (a.e.t.) (4–3 p)	(Bangladesh) Sheikh Jamal Dhanmondi	
2015	United U19	2–1	East Bengal U19	^{9}
2016	Tata Football Academy	3–2 (a.e.t.)	AIFF U19	^{9}
2017	Pune City U19	3–0	Mohun Bagan U19	^{9}
2018	East Bengal U19	1–1 (a.e.t.) (4–2 p)	Mohun Bagan U19	^{9}
2019	Not held			^{1}
2020	Real Kashmir	2–1	George Telegraph	
2021	Real Kashmir	2–1	Sreenidi Deccan	
2022	Not held			
2023	Not held			
2024	Not held			
2025	Mohun Bagan	1–1 (a.e.t.) (5–4 p)	East Bengal	
2026	Mohun Bagan	1–0	East Bengal	

Notes:

1. Tournament not held.
2. Joint winners.
3. An all-Indian side won the Shield for the first time.
4. The final was abandoned due to a dispute between the finalists over extra time.
5. A scheduled fourth match was scratched and Indian Culture League were awarded the Shield as East Bengal played with an unregistered player in the third match.
6. The replay was abandoned due to torrential rain, but Mohun Bagan objected to a third match and refused to play: the third match was scratched and East Bengal were awarded the Shield.
7. The final was abandoned at half-time after Mohammedan Sporting refused to continue, and East Bengal were awarded the Shield.
8. The final was abandoned after 35 minutes after Palmeiras started a violent brawl, with Palmeiras fans also throwing chairs onto the pitch: East Bengal were awarded the Shield, and the IFA ordered that Palmeiras' results be deleted from the records.
9. Organised as an Under-19 tournament.

== Performance by teams ==
=== Performance by Indian teams ===
Though the tournament was dominated by the British Army teams during its initial years, yet British Indian teams too participated representing India prior to the independence, but very few were an all-Indian side. Mohun Bagan AC the first all-Indian side to win the tournament in 1911.

==== Top 10 Indian teams in IFA Shield ====
No.	Team	Championships (latest)	Runners-up
1	East Bengal	29 (2018)	13
2	Mohun Bagan	22 (2026)	20
3	Calcutta	9 (1924)	8
4	Mohammedan	6 (2014)	4
5	Dalhousie	2 (1905)	5
6	Churchill Brothers	2 (2011)	1
6	United	2 (2015)	1
8	Mahindra United	2 (2008)	0
8	Real Kashmir	2 (2021)	0
10	Aryan	2 (1983)	2
10	Police	1 (1939)	2

=== Performance by overseas teams ===
- Winners:
  - (Soviet Union) FC Ararat Yerevan (1978)
  - (Uruguay) Club Atlético Peñarol (1985)
  - (Uzbekistan) Pakhtakor Tashkent FK (1993)
  - (Myanmar) Finance and Revenue FC (2004)
  - (Germany) FC Bayern Munich II (2005)
- Runners-up:
  - (Iran) PAS Tehran FC (1970)
  - (North Korea) Pyongyang SC (1973)
  - (Soviet Union) FC Shakhtar Donetsk (1985)
  - (Kazakhstan) Irtysh Pavlodar FK (1993)
  - (Bangladesh) Mohammedan SC Dhaka (1995)
  - (Iraq) Al-Karkh SC (1996)
  - (Brazil) Palmeiras B (2001)
  - (South Africa) Santos FC (2008)
  - (Bangladesh) Sheikh Jamal Dhanmondi Club (2014)

== Awards ==
Since the 123rd edition of the tournament, the awards for the Best Coach of the tournament, the Best Player of the tournament, the highest goalscorer of the tournament and Fair Play has been renamed in honour of India's football icons- P. K. Banerjee, Chuni Goswami and Krishanu Dey, and renowned sports photojournalist – Ronojoy 'Ronny' Roy.

=== Krishanu Dey Memorial Award ===
Year	Player	Goals	Club
2020	(Nigeria) Abegunrin Adefemi Lukman	5	Real Kashmir
2021	(Ghana) Rahim Osumanu	5	Gokulam Kerala

=== P. K. Banerjee Memorial Award ===
As of December 2020

Year	Head coach	Club
2020	(India) Ranjan Bhattacharya	George Telegraph

=== Chuni Goswami Memorial Award ===
Year	Player	Club
2020	(Scotland) Mason Robertson	Real Kashmir
2021	(Scotland) Mason Robertson	Real Kashmir

=== Ronny Roy Fair Play Award ===
As of December 2021

Year	Club
2020	(India) Real Kashmir
2021	(India) Indian Arrows

== See also ==
- List of oldest football competitions

== Bibliography ==
- Nath, Nirmal (2011). History of Indian Football: Upto 2009–10. Readers Service. ISBN 9788187891963. Archived from the original on 22 July 2022.
- "The passage of football in India". ifawb.org. Kolkata: Indian Football Association. Archived from the original on 29 January 2021.
- "The Mohun Bagan AC winning Team at the 1911 IFA-Shield". indianfootball.de. Indian Football Network. 2008. Archived from the original on 4 February 2019.
