= East Bengal FC in international football =

East Bengal in International Football
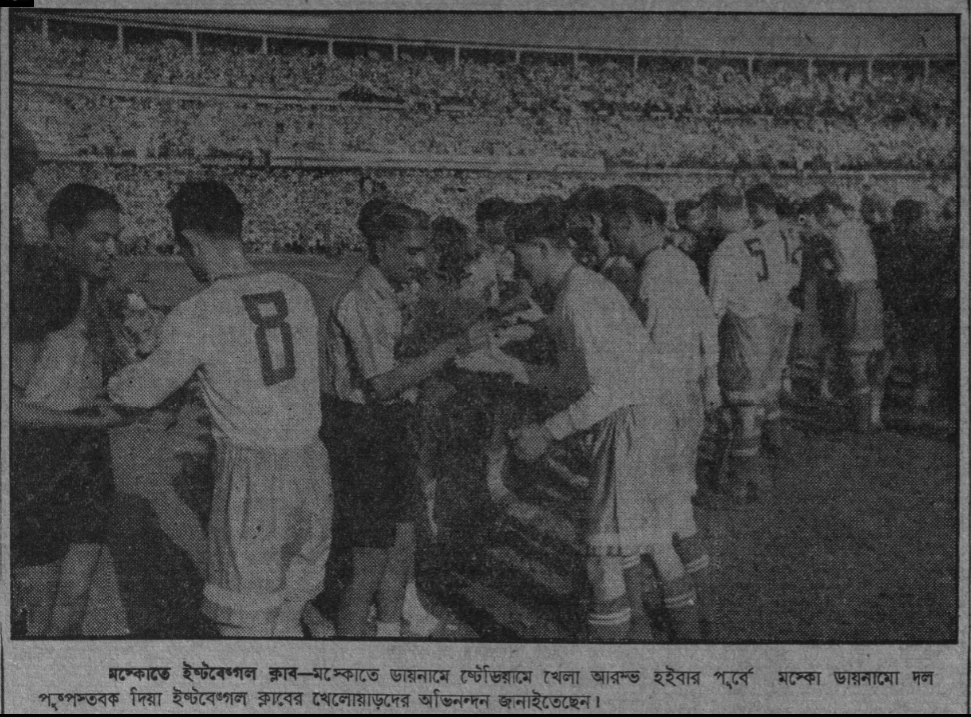
- East Bengal vs Dynamo Torpedo, at the Central Dynamo Stadium in Moscow (21 August 1953).
- Club: (India) East Bengal
- Most appearances: AFC Cup; Mehtab Hossain (34)
- Top scorer: All Competitions Bhaichung Bhutia (11); Asian Club Championship Debasish Roy (8); Asian Cup Winners' Cup Bhaichung Bhutia (8); AFC Cup Cristiano Junior and Chidi Edeh (6)
- First entry: 1985–86
- Latest entry: 2024–25

Titles
- ASEAN Club Championship: 1: 2003

East Bengal Football Club is an Indian association football club based in Kolkata, West Bengal, which competes in the top tier of Indian football. The club was formed when the vice-president of Jorabagan, Suresh Chandra Chaudhuri, resigned when Jorabagan sent out their starting eleven but with the notable exclusion of defender Sailesh Bose who was dropped from the squad for reasons not disclosed when they were about to face Mohun Bagan in the Coochbehar Cup Semi-Final on 28 July 1920. He along with Raja Manmatha Nath Chaudhuri, Ramesh Chandra Sen, and Aurobinda Ghosh, formed East Bengal, in Jorabagan home of Suresh Chandra on 1 August 1920; 99 years ago. East Bengal started playing in the Calcutta Football League 2nd division from 1921 and in 1925 they qualified for the first division for the first time and since then they have won numerous titles in Indian Football.

East Bengal joined the National Football League since its inception in 1996 and is the only club to play all seasons till date, even after its name change to I-League in 2007. East Bengal have won the National Football League thrice: 2000–01, 2002–03 and 2003–04 and became runners up 7 times, the most number of times by any Indian football club. Among other trophies, East Bengal have won the Calcutta Football League 39 times, IFA Shield 28 times, Federation Cup 8 times and the Durand Cup 16 times.

Apart from domestic success, East Bengal club has been extremely successful among Indian football clubs in the international arena, having won four trophies on foreign soil including the famous ASEAN Club Championship in 2003.

== Major appearances ==
Competition	No. of appearances	Seasons	Best result
Asian Club Championship (Note: Was known as AFC Champions League from 2002 till 2024 and is now known as the AFC Champions League Elite since 2024.)	2	1985–86, 1998–99	Group stages (1985–86)
Asian Cup Winners' Cup	5	1991–92, 1993–94, 1994–95, 1995, 1997–98	Quarter-finals (1991–92)
AFC Champions League Two (Note: Was known as AFC Cup from 2004 till 2024 and is now known as the AFC Champions League Two since 2024.)	10	2004, 2005, 2008, 2010, 2011, 2012, 2013, 2015, 2024–25, 2026–27	Semi-finals (2013)
AFC Challenge League	1	2024–25	Quarter-finals (2024–25)

== Participation record ==
AFC Tournaments
Season	Competition	Result	Ref.
1985–86	Central Asia Champions' Cup	Champions	
1985–86	Asian Club Championship	Group stage	
1991–92	Asian Cup Winners' Cup	Quarter Finals	
1993–94	Asian Cup Winners' Cup	Second Round	
1994–95	Asian Cup Winners' Cup	First Round	
1995–96	Asian Cup Winners' Cup	Second Round	
1997–98	Asian Cup Winners' Cup	Second Round	
1998–99	Asian Club Championship	First Round	
2003–04	AFC Cup	Quarter Finals	
2004–05	AFC Cup	Group stage	
2007–08	AFC Cup	Group stage	
2009–10	AFC Cup	Group stage	
2010–11	AFC Cup	Group stage	
2011–12	AFC Cup	Group stage	
2012–13	AFC Cup	Semi Finals	
2014–15	AFC Cup	Group stage	
2024–25	AFC Champions League Two	Preliminary stage	
2024–25	AFC Challenge League	Quarter finals	
2026–27	AFC Champions League Two	Group stage	

AFF Tournaments
Season	Country	Competition	Result
2003–04	Indonesia	2003 ASEAN Club Championship	Champions

Invitational Tournaments
Season	Country	Competition	Result
1953–54	Romania	1953 World Youth Festival	Fourth Place
1991–92	Bangladesh	1991 BTC Club Cup	Semi Finals
1993–94	Nepal	1993 Wai Wai Cup	Champions
1996–97	Nepal	1996 Coca-Cola Cup	Semi Finals
1996–97	Bangladesh	1996 Bangabandhu Cup	Group stage
2004–05	England	2004 Pepsi Max Challenge Cup	Fourth Place
2004–05	Nepal	2004 San Miguel International Cup	Champions
2011–12	Vietnam	2011 BTV Becamex IDC Cup	Group stage
2015–16	Bangladesh	2015 Sheikh Kamal International Club Cup	Runner's Up

== Statistics ==
=== Overall Record in Continental Competitions ===
Includes records from qualifier and preliminary stage matches as well.

Competition	First match	Last match	Record							
Competition	First match	Last match	Pld	W	D	L	GF	GA	GD	Win %
Asian Club Championship	2 August 1985	3 October 1998	9	5	1	3	21	10	+11	55.56
Asian Cup Winners' Cup	1 September 1991	8 November 1997	18	7	1	10	31	33	−2	38.89
AFC Cup / AFC Champions League Two	10 February 2004	27 October 2026	60	16	14	30	81	113	−32	26.67
AFC Challenge League	26 October 2024	12 March 2025	5	2	1	2	10	7	+3	40.00
Total			92	30	17	45	143	163	−20	32.61

Last updated: 27 October 2026
Source: Competitions

=== Top scorers ===
Rank	Pos.	Nat.	Name	Asian CC	Asian CWC	AFC Cup/AFC CL Two	AFC CGL	Total
1	FW	(India)	Bhaichung Bhutia	—	8	3	—	11
2	FW	(India)	Debasish Roy	8	—	—	—	8
3	FW	(Brazil)	Cristiano Júnior	—	—	6	—	6
3	FW	(Nigeria)	Chidi Edeh	—	—	6	—	6
5	FW	(India)	Biswajit Bhattacharya	5	—	—	—	5
5	MF	(India)	Carlton Chapman	—	5	—	—	5
5	FW	(Australia)	Tolgay Özbey	—	—	5	—	5
8	FW	(Nigeria)	Mike Okoro	—	—	4	—	4
8	FW	(Brazil)	Edmilson Marques Pardal	—	—	4	—	4
8	MF	(India)	Lalrindika Ralte	—	—	4	—	4
8	MF	(Nigeria)	Penn Orji	—	—	4	—	4
8	FW	(Nigeria)	Ranti Martins	—	—	4	—	4
8	FW	(Greece)	Dimitrios Diamantakos	—	—	0	4	4
8	FW	(India)	David Lalhlansanga	—	—	4	0	4

=== Hat tricks ===
Date	Name	Opponent	Competition	Result	Ref.
2 August 1985	(India) Biswajit Bhattacharya^{4}	(Nepal) New Road Team	1985–86 Asian Club Championship	7–0	
10 August 1985	(India) Debasish Roy	(Maldives) Club Valencia	1985–86 Asian Club Championship	9–0	
1 October 1993	(India) Carlton Chapman	(Iraq) Al-Zawra'a SC	1993-94 Asian Cup Winners' Cup	6–2	
16 July 2003	(India) Bhaichung Bhutia^{5}	(Philippines) Philippine Army FC	2003 ASEAN Club Championship	6–0	
25 May 2005	(Nigeria) Ernest Jeremiah	(Turkmenistan) Nebitçi Balkanabat	2005 AFC Cup	3–2	
15 May 2013	(Nigeria) Chidi Edeh	(Myanmar) Yangon United	2013 AFC Cup	5–1	

^{4} Scored 4 Goals
^{6} Scored 6 Goals

== Asian Club Championship ==
The AFC Champions League is an annual continental club football competition organised by the Asian Football Confederation. Introduced in 1967 as the Asian Club Championship, the competition rebranded and took on its current name in 2002 as a result of the merger between the Asian Club Championship, the Asian Cup Winners' Cup and the Asian Super Cup. East Bengal took part in the competition twice (1985–86 and 1998–99), failing to go past the group stage/first round both times.

=== 1985–86 Asian Club Championship ===
==== 1985 Central Asia Champions' Cup ====
Pos	Team	Pld	W	D	L	GF	GA	GD	Pts	Qualification
1	(India) East Bengal	5	5	0	0	20	0	+20	10	Qualified for 1985–86 Asian Club Championship
2	(Bangladesh) Abahani Krira Chakra	5	4	0	1	17	4	+13	8	
3	(Sri Lanka) Saunders (H)	5	2	1	2	12	8	+4	5	
4	(Pakistan) PIA	5	1	2	2	8	8	0	4	
5	(Nepal) New Road Team	5	1	1	3	8	11	−3	3	
6	(Maldives) Club Valencia	5	0	0	5	2	36	−34	0	

Source: Champions' Cup 1985/86
(H) Hosts
- Afghanistan and Iran champions withdrew.

East Bengal qualified for the 1985–86 Asian Club Championship after winning the 1985 Federation Cup. The Red and Gold brigade became the first Indian "club" to qualify for the Asian Club Championship. The format of the tournament was different with different zonal tournaments that were held and the winners of these zonal tournaments would progress into the main finals to be held in Jedah, Saudi Arabia. East Bengal was part of the Central Asia Zone, and the tournament was named Coca-Cola Cup. They were to face the champions of Sri Lanka, Bangladesh, Nepal, Pakistan, Afghanistan, Iran and Maldives however, the two teams from Iran and Afghanistan withdrew their names. The team traveled to Colombo, Sri Lanka where the tournament was hosted and in the first game defeated the champions of Nepal, New Road Team by 7–0 to start their campaign, with forward Biswajit Bhattacharya scoring four goals in the game. In the second match against the favourites Abahani Krira Chakra from Bangladesh, East Bengal managed a 1–0 victory courtesy of a solitary strike from forward Debasish Roy. The next three games, East Bengal won with ease, including a 9–0 victory over Maldivian champions Club Valencia, with Debasish Roy scoring a hattrick, and thus recording the biggest margin of victory by an Indian team over any foreign opponents till date. East Bengal became the champion of the tournament winning all the games, without conceding a single goal. Defender Tarun Dey was awarded the Man of the Tournament award while forward Debasish Roy ended as the second top scorer with 7 goals.

===== Matches =====
Win Draw Loss

2 August 1985 1	East Bengal (India)	7–0	(Nepal) New Road Team	Colombo, Sri Lanka
	Biswajit Bhattacharya; Debasish Roy; Birbhadra Pradhan (o.g.)			Stadium: Sugathadasa Stadium

5 August 1985 2	East Bengal (India)	1–0	(Bangladesh) Abahani Krira Chakra	Colombo, Sri Lanka
	Debasish Roy			Stadium: Sugathadasa Stadium

7 August 1985 3	East Bengal (India)	2–0	(Pakistan) PIA	Colombo, Sri Lanka
	Biswajit Bhattacharya; Debasish Roy			Stadium: Sugathadasa Stadium

10 August 1985 4	East Bengal (India)	9–0	(Maldives) Club Valencia	Colombo, Sri Lanka
	Debasish Roy; Jamshid Nassiri; Monojit Das; Debasish Mishra; Samar Choudhury			Stadium: Sugathadasa Stadium

14 August 1985 5	East Bengal (India)	1–0	(Sri Lanka) Saunders	Colombo, Sri Lanka
	Jamshid Nassiri			Stadium: Sugathadasa Stadium

==== 1985–86 Asian Club Championship ====
East Bengal qualified for the main round of the 1985–86 Asian Club Championship by winning the Coca-Cola Cup in Sri Lanka and was allotted into the Group A, along with Al-Ahli of Saudi Arabia and Krama Yudha Tiga Berlian of Indonesia. Assistant coach Shyam Thapa took charge of the team after P. K. Banerjee had resigned from his position after the Coca-Cola Cup victory as he took over the India national team. In the opening match, on 19 January 1986, East Bengal faced the Saudi and West Asia champions Al-Ahli and even managed to score first with Debasish Roy scoring in the 33rd minute but the Saudi team came back strong with two goals from Khaled Abu Rass as they lost 2–1. In the second game on 21 January 1986, East Bengal faced another defeat against Indonesian and ASEAN champions Krama Yudha Tiga Berlian as they went down 2–0 and were eliminated from the tournament.

==== Group stage ====
East Bengal FC was drawn in Group A along with Al-Ahli of Saudi Arabia and Krama Yudha Tiga Berlian of Indonesia.

Pos	Team	Pld	W	D	L	GF	GA	GD	Pts	Qualification
1	(Saudi Arabia) Al-Ahli Jeddah (H)	2	2	0	0	3	1	+2	4	Advance to knockout stage
2	(Indonesia) Krama Yudha Tiga Berlian	2	1	0	1	2	1	+1	2	Advance to knockout stage
3	(India) East Bengal	2	0	0	2	1	4	−3	0	

Source: Champions' Cup 1985/86
(H) Hosts

===== Matches =====
Win Draw Loss

19 January 1986 1	Al-Ahli (Saudi Arabia)	2–1	(India) East Bengal	Jeddah, Saudi Arabia
	Khaled Abu Rass 38', 88'		Debashish Roy 33'	Stadium: Prince Abdullah Stadium

21 January 1986 2	East Bengal (India)	0–2	(Indonesia) Krama Yudha Tiga Berlian	Jeddah, Saudi Arabia
			Bambang Nurdiansyah 65'; Saud Lumban Tobing 74'	Stadium: Prince Abdullah Stadium

=== 1998–99 Asian Club Championship ===
East Bengal took part in the 1998–99 Asian Club Championship after finishing runners-up of the 1997–98 National Football League and was drawn against Chinese giants Dalian Wanda FC in the first round. On 19 September 1998, East Bengal travelled to Dalian, China for the first leg of the tie and suffered a 6–0 loss, their heaviest defeat in continental competitions to this date. China national team forward Wang Tao scored a hat-trick for the Chinese side. In the return leg on 3 October 1998, East Bengal managed to hold on to a 0–0 draw at the Kanchenjunga Stadium in Siliguri and were eliminated from the competition.

==== Matches ====
Win Draw Loss

19 September 1998 First Round	Dalian Wanda (China)	6–0	(India) East Bengal	Dalian, China
	Wang Tao; Hans Eklund; Hao Haidong			Stadium: Jinzhou Stadium

3 October 1998 First Round	East Bengal (India)	0–0 (0–6 agg.)	(China) Dalian Wanda	Siliguri, India
				Stadium: Kanchenjunga Stadium

== Asian Cup Winners' Cup ==
The Asian Cup Winners' Cup was a football competition run by the Asian Football Confederation. The competition was started in 1991 as a tournament for all the domestic cup winners from countries affiliated to the AFC. In India, the winners of the Durand Cup used to participate in the tournament. East Bengal took part in the Asian Cup Winners' Cup five times, reaching the quarter-finals in their maiden appearance in 1991–92.

=== 1991–92 Asian Cup Winners' Cup ===
East Bengal qualified for the 1991–92 Asian Cup Winners' Cup by winning the 1991 Durand Cup. The 1991 season also saw East Bengal, under the coaching of Syed Nayeemuddin, win the Calcutta Football League without even conceding a single goal throughout the tournament. East Bengal was drawn against Abhani Krira Chakra of Bangladesh in the first round of the tournament. In the first-leg, away at the Bangabandhu Stadium, East Bengal drew goalless against a resolute Abahani side. In the return leg at the Salt Lake Stadium, East Bengal managed to grab a 1–0 victory with Bikash Panji scoring the solitary winner for the Red and Gold brigade as they reached the Quarter-finals where they faced Nissan FC of Japan, who would eventually go on to become the Champions of the tournament. In the first-leg, playing home at the Salt Lake Stadium, East Bengal was beaten 1–3 by the 1991 Emperor's Cup champions and in the return leg, East Bengal lost 4–0 and was eliminated from the tournament.

==== Matches ====
Win Draw Loss

3 November 1991 First Round	Abhani Krira Chakra (Bangladesh)	0–0	(India) East Bengal	Dhaka, Bangladesh
				Stadium: Bangabandhu National Stadium

8 November 1991 First Round	East Bengal (India)	1–0 (1–0 agg.)	(Bangladesh) Abhani Krira Chakra	Kolkata, India
	Bikash Panji			Stadium: Salt Lake Stadium

5 December 1991 Quarter-Final	East Bengal (India)	1–3	(Japan) Nissan	Kolkata, India
	Peter Maguire		Matsuhashi; Zaizen	Stadium: Salt Lake Stadium

11 December 1991 Quarter-Final	Nissan (Japan)	4–0 (7–1 agg.)	(India) East Bengal	Yokohama, Japan
	Matsuhashi; Jinno			Stadium: Mitsuzawa Football Stadium

=== 1993–94 Asian Cup Winners' Cup ===
East Bengal qualified for the 1993–94 Asian Cup Winners' Cup by winning the 1993 Durand Cup. East Bengal was drawn with Al-Zawra of Iraq, the 1992–93 Iraq FA Cup champions in the first round of the tournament. Due to the ongoing war situation in Iraq, both the legs were held in India, the first leg at the Salt Lake Stadium while the second leg was held at the Kanchenjunga Stadium in Siliguri, which was a home game for the Iraq side. In the first leg, East Bengal shocked the Iraqi champions and defeated them 6–2 with Carlton Chapman scoring a hat-trick and Sisir Ghosh, Aqueel Ansari and Kumaresh Bhawal scoring one each for East Bengal. Mudhir Khalef Muhsim and Sahib Abbas Hassan scored two for the Iraqi champions. In the return leg, however, Al-Zawra came back strong with a 2–0 win at Siliguri with goals from Sahib Abbas Hassan and Ziad Tariq Aziz, but East Bengal progressed into the second round with a 6–4 aggregate score. In the second round, East Bengal faced South China of Hong Kong. East Bengal lost the first leg at home 1–0 and suffered a 4–1 defeat away in Hong Kong as they were eliminated from the tournament.

==== Matches ====
Win Draw Loss

6 October 1993 First Round	East Bengal (India)	6–2	(Iraq) Al-Zawra	Kolkata, India
	Chapman (?); Ghosh (?); Ansari (?); Bhawal (?)		Khalaf (?); Abbas (?)	Stadium: Salt Lake Stadium

8 October 1993 First Round	Al-Zawra (Iraq)	2–0 (4–6 agg.)	(India) East Bengal	Siliguri, India
	Abbas (?); Tariq (?)			Stadium: Kanchenjunga Stadium

1 November 1993 Second Round	East Bengal (India)	0–1	(Hong Kong) South China	Kolkata, India
			Wai Chi Loh (?)	Stadium: Salt Lake Stadium

7 November 1993 Second Round	South China (Hong Kong)	4–1 (5–1 agg.)	(India) East Bengal	Causeway Bay, Hong Kong
	Aau (?); Marco (?); Chungman (?)		Bhutia (?)	Stadium: Hong Kong Stadium

=== 1994–95 Asian Cup Winners' Cup ===
East Bengal qualified for the 1994–95 Asian Cup Winners' Cup after being runner-up of the 1994 Durand Cup, as Mohun Bagan who were the champions, also won the Federation Cup and qualified for the 1994–95 Asian Club Championship. In the preliminary round for the East Asia zone held in Colombo Sri Lanka, East Bengal was drawn with Renown of Sri Lanka and Club Lagoons of Maldives. East Bengal won 4–0 in the opening game against Club Lagoons but lost 2–1 against the hosts Renown in their second match to finish second in the group. East Bengal qualified for the main tournament as the group runners and faced TOT of Thailand. In the first leg game away in Bangkok, East Bengal lost 4–1 to the 1993 Thai FA Cup champions. In the return leg, however, East Bengal withdrew from the tournament as the match was not held due to a plague scare in Kolkata and no dates could be confirmed. Telecom Club advanced to the quarterfinal on the basis of their first-leg triumph.

==== Preliminary round (East Asia) ====
East Bengal was drawn with Renown SC of Sri Lanka and Club Lagoons of Maldives in the preliminary round of the tournament.

Team	Pld	W	D	L	GF	GA	GD	Pts
(Sri Lanka) Renown SC	1	1	0	0	2	1	+1	2 (Note: missing one result (Renown won or drew and won the group))
(India) East Bengal	2	1	0	1	5	2	+3	2
(Maldives) Club Lagoons	1	0	0	1	0	4	−4	0

Source: RSSSF

==== Matches ====
Win Draw Loss

4 August 1994 Preliminary	East Bengal (India)	4–0	(Maldives) Club Lagoons	Colombo, Sri Lanka
	Carlton Chapman; Shishir Ghosh; Sanjay Majhi			Stadium: Sugathadasa Stadium

6 August 1994 Preliminary	Renown (Sri Lanka)	2–1	(India) East Bengal	Colombo, Sri Lanka
	Debanath (?)		Kiron Khongsai (?)	Stadium: Sugathadasa Stadium

3 September 1994 First Round	TOT (Thailand)	4–1	(India) East Bengal	Bangkok, Thailand
	Ampan (?); Lunpet (?); Aistukaida (?)		Bhaichung Bhutia	Stadium: TOT Stadium

16 September 1994 First Round	East Bengal (India)	(w/o) (1–7 agg.)	(Thailand) TOT	Kolkata, India
				Stadium: Salt Lake Stadium

=== 1995–96 Asian Cup Winners' Cup ===
East Bengal qualified for the 1995–96 Asian Cup Winners' Cup by winning the 1995 Durand Cup. In the first round, East Bengal received a bye and progressed into the second round of the tournament where they were drawn against New Radiant of Maldives. In the first leg, away at Malé, East Bengal suffered a 3–0 defeat which became too big of a margin to overcome in the second leg, even after winning 2–0 at home, as they were eliminated from the tournament with a 2–3 aggregate score in favour of New Radiant. Biswanath Mondal and Bhaichung Bhutia had scored in the home win for East Bengal.

==== Matches ====
Win Draw Loss

8 October 1995 Second Round	New Radiant (Maldives)	3–0	(India) East Bengal	Malé, Maldives
	no Information			Stadium: Rasmee Dhandu Stadium

22 October 1995 Second Round	East Bengal (India)	2–0 (2–3 agg.)	(Maldives) New Radiant	Kolkata, India
	Biswanath Mondal; Bhaichung Bhutia			Stadium: Salt Lake Stadium

=== 1997–98 Asian Cup Winners' Cup ===
East Bengal qualified for the 1997–98 Asian Cup Winners' Cup after winning the 1996 Indian Federation Cup. Churchill Brothers were supposed to get the slot for being the runners-up of the 1996–97 National Football League but since JCT, the champions, did not participate in the 1997–98 Asian Club Championship, Churchill Brothers got the spot and East Bengal qualified for the Asian Cup Winners' Cup. In the first round, East Bengal was drawn against Tribhuvan Club of Nepal and in the first leg at home, East Bengal recorded an 8–0 win over the side from Nepal, their second biggest win in continental football. In the away game, East Bengal snatched up a 3–0 victory as they progressed into the second round with an 11–0 aggregate score. In the second round, East Bengal faced the 1996 Emperor's Cup champions Verdy Kawasaki of Japan. In the first leg, away at Naraha, Fukushima, East Bengal suffered a 5–2 defeat against the J League side, however, in the return leg, at Kolkata, East Bengal surprised the Japanese team with a famous 1–0 win courtesy of a solitary strike from Kenyan defender Sammy Omollo. Naushad Moosa also missed a penalty for East Bengal and they were eliminated with a 5–3 aggregate score for Verdy Kawasaki.

==== Matches ====
Win Draw Loss

15 August 1997 First Round	East Bengal (India)	8–0	(Nepal) Tribhuvan Club	Kolkata, India
	Bhaichung Bhutia (?); Somatai Shaiza (?); Naushad Moosa (?); Marcelo Garcia (?); Nazimul Haq (?); Falguni Dutta (?); A Sarvanan (?)			Stadium: Salt Lake Stadium

15 September 1997 First Round	Tribhuvan Club (Nepal)	0–3 (0–11 agg.)	(India) East Bengal	Kathmandu, Nepal
			Bhaichung Bhutia (?); Marcelo Garcia (?); Sammy Omollo (?)	Stadium: Dasarath Rangasala Stadium

15 October 1997 Second Round	Verdy Kawasaki (Japan)	5–2	(India) East Bengal	Naraha, Fukushima, Japan
	Sugawara (?); Alcindo (?); Y. Miura (?)		Bhaichung Bhutia (?)	Stadium: J-Village Stadium; Attendance: 2,136

8 November 1997 Second Round	East Bengal (India)	1–0 (3–5 agg.)	(Japan) Verdy Kawasaki	Kolkata, India
	Naushad Moosa (penalty missed) 41'; Sammy Omollo 61'	Report		Stadium: Salt Lake Stadium; Attendance: 30,000

== AFC Cup ==
The AFC Cup is an annual continental club football competition organised by the Asian Football Confederation, started in 2004. The competition is played primarily between clubs from nations that did not receive direct qualifying slots in the top-tier AFC Champions League, based on the AFC Club Competitions Ranking. In India, the winners of the Federation Cup and the I-League received direct entries into the tournament. Since the Federation Cup was abolished in 2017, the slot was given to the play-off winners of the Indian Super League. East Bengal has participated eight times in the tournament, reaching the knockout stages twice including a semi-final appearance in 2013.

=== 2004 AFC Cup ===
East Bengal qualified for the 2004 AFC Cup after winning the 2002–03 National Football League and was placed in Group E alongside Geylang United of Singapore, Negeri Sembilan of Malaysia and Island of Maldives. East Bengal began their campaign on a terrific note as they won all of their first four matches in the group stages and confirmed their place in the quarter-finals. They set a record of winning eight consecutive matches against foreign opposition, the most by any Indian team, bettering their own record of five wins, back in the Coca-Cola Cup. East Bengal also thus became the first Indian team to qualify for AFC Cup knockout stages, where they faced the eventual finalist Al-Jaish of Syria. In the first leg at home, East Bengal held the Syrian champions to a goalless draw, however, the Syrian team won 3–0 at home and East Bengal were eliminated from the tournament.

==== Group stage ====
Pos	Team	Pld	W	D	L	GF	GA	GD	Pts	Qualification
1	(India) East Bengal	6	4	1	1	14	8	+6	13	Advance to Quarter-finals
2	(Singapore) Geylang United	6	4	1	1	12	5	+7	13	Advance to Quarter-finals
3	(Malaysia) Negeri Sembilan	6	2	0	4	11	9	+2	6	
4	(Maldives) Island	6	1	0	5	2	17	−15	3	

Source: AFC Cup 2004

=== Bracket ===
Quarter-finals
(Syria) Al-Wahda (a)	2	2	4
(Lebanon) Al-Nejmeh Beirut	1	3	4
(Malaysia) Perak FA	1	2	3
(Singapore) Geylang United	2	3	5
(India) East Bengal	0	0	0
(Syria) Al-Jaish	0	3	3
(Lebanon) Olympic Beirut	3	1	4
(Singapore) Home United	3	2	5

Semi-Finals
(Syria) Al-Wahda	1	1	2
(Singapore) Geylang United	1	0	1
(Syria) Al-Jaish	4	2	6
(Singapore) Home United	0	1	1

Final
(Syria) Al-Wahda	2	1	3
(Syria) Al-Jaish (a)	3	0	3

===== Matches =====
Win Draw Loss

10 February 2004 Group stage	Geylang United (Singapore)	2–3	(India) East Bengal	Kowloon, Hong Kong
	Mohd Hafiz Rahim 40'; Jeykanth Jeyapal 90'	(Report)	Cristiano Junior 45', 76'; Bijen Singh 83'	Stadium: Mong Kok Stadium; Attendance: 369; Referee: K Matsumura

25 February 2004 Group stage	East Bengal (India)	4–2	(Malaysia) Negeri Sembilan	Kolkata, India
	Mike Okoro 9'; Cristiano Junior 34' (pen.), 70'; Baichung Bhutia 77'	(Report)	K. Rajan 45'; Shahrin Abdul Majid 64'	Stadium: Salt Lake Stadium; Referee: C Win

7 April 2004 Group stage	Island (Maldives)	1–2	(India) East Bengal	Malé, Maldives
	Ahmed Sunain 72' (pen.)	(Report)	Baichung Bhutia 36'; Mike Okoro 90'	Stadium: National Stadium; Attendance: 6,000; Referee: S Mujghef

21 April 2004 Group stage	East Bengal (India)	3–0	(Maldives) Island	Kolkata, India
	Douglas 9'; Cristiano Junior 36'; Mike Okoro 85'	(Report)		Stadium: Salt Lake Stadium; Referee: A Albadwawi

5 May 2004 Group stage	East Bengal (India)	1–1	(Singapore) Geylang United	Kolkata, India
	Mike Okoro 76'	(Report)	Daniel Hill 33'	Stadium: Salt Lake Stadium; Referee: B Williams

18 May 2004 Group stage	Negeri Sembilan (Malaysia)	2–1	(India) East Bengal	Kowloon, Hong Kong
	Suharmin Yusof 23', 49'	(Report)	Cristiano Junior 24'	Stadium: Mong Kok Stadium; Attendance: 208; Referee: S Tongkhan

14 September 2004 Quarter-Final	East Bengal (India)	0–0	(Syria) Al-Jaish	Kolkata, India
				Stadium: Salt Lake Stadium; Attendance: 40,000; Referee: Lusullin Naii

21 September 2004 Quarter-Final	Al-Jaish (Syria)	3–0 (3-0 agg.)	(India) East Bengal	Amman, Jordan
	Adel Abdullah 16'; Mohamed Al Zeno 50'; Feras Esmaeel 87'			Stadium: King Abdullah Stadium

=== 2005 AFC Cup ===
East Bengal qualified for the 2005 AFC Cup after winning the 2003–04 National Football League and was placed in Group B alongside Al-Faisaly of Jordan, Nebitçi Balkanabat of Turkmenistan and Muktijoddha Sangsad of Bangladesh. In the opening game, at home, East Bengal drew goalless with Muktijoddha Sangsad of Bangladesh. East Bengal lost the next three matches to Nebitçi Balkanabat away and Al-Faisaly twice both home and away. They managed to win the last two matches, first a 1–0 win against Muktijoddha Sangsad away in Dhaka and then a 3–2 win at home against Nebitçi Balkanabat, courtesy of a hat-trick scored by Earnest Jeremiah. However, with two wins and one draw, East Bengal finished third in the group with seven points and was eliminated from the tournament.

==== Group stage ====
Pos	Team	Pld	W	D	L	GF	GA	GD	Pts	Qualification
1	(Jordan) Al-Faisaly	6	4	2	0	15	5	+10	14	Advance to Knockout stage
2	(Turkmenistan) Nebitçi	6	2	2	2	11	11	0	8	
3	(India) East Bengal	6	2	1	3	6	11	−5	7	
4	(Bangladesh) Muktijoddha Sangsad	6	1	1	4	3	8	−5	4	

Source: RSSSF

===== Matches =====
Win Draw Loss

9 March 2005 Group stage	East Bengal (India)	0–0	(Bangladesh) Muktijoddha Sangsad	Kolkata, India
				Stadium: Salt Lake Stadium

16 March 2005 Group stage	Nebitçi Balkanabat (Turkmenistan)	3–2	(India) East Bengal	Balkanabat, Turkmenistan
	Vitaliy Alikperov 1'; Rowshen Meredov 60'; Hojaahmet Arazov 83'		Marcos Secco 52'; Baichung Bhutia 90+2'	Stadium: Balkanabat Stadium

6 April 2005 Group stage	Al-Faisaly (Jordan)	5–0	(India) East Bengal	Amman, Jordan
	Mo'ayyad Salim 13', 43', 73'; Saman Halasa 50', 69'			Stadium: Amman International Stadium

20 April 2005 Group stage	East Bengal (India)	0–1	(Jordan) Al-Faisaly	Kolkata, India
			Hatem Aqel 31' (pen.)	Stadium: Salt Lake Stadium

11 May 2005 Group stage	Muktijoddha Sangsad (Bangladesh)	0–1	(India) East Bengal	Dhaka, Bangladesh
			Bijen Singh 75'	Stadium: Bangabandhu Stadium

25 May 2005 Group stage	East Bengal (India)	3–2	(Turkmenistan) Nebitçi Balkanabat	Kolkata, India
	Earnest Jeremiah 28', 57', 63'		Farhat Bazarov 53'; Hojaahmet Arazov 88'	Stadium: Salt Lake Stadium

=== 2008 AFC Cup ===
East Bengal FC qualified for the 2008 AFC Cup after winning the 2007 Federation Cup in Ludhiana and were placed in Group B alongside Safa SC of Lebanon, Al-Wahdat of Jordan and Al-Ahli San‘a’ of Yemen. The Red and Gold brigade lost the first match to Safa SC away at the Sports City Stadium, Beirut by a solitary goal but won back to back matches, first against Al-Ahli San‘a’ at the Salt Lake Stadium courtesy of a brilliant strike by Edmilson Marques Pardal and then against Al-Wahdat away at the Prince Mohammad Stadium, Zarqa by 2–0 with strikes from Alvito D'Cunha and Ikechukwu Gift Ibe, thus becoming the first Indian club to win at away against a West Asian team. East Bengal FC however, could not win any more matches in the group stage as they finished third with 2 wins and a draw and were eliminated on goal difference.

==== Group stage ====
Pos	Team	Pld	W	D	L	GF	GA	GD	Pts	Qualification
1	(Lebanon) Safa	6	2	4	0	8	6	+2	10	Advance to Knockout stage
2	(Jordan) Al-Wahdat	6	1	4	1	12	12	0	7	
3	(India) East Bengal	6	2	1	3	5	6	−1	7	
4	(Yemen) Ahli Sanaa Club	6	1	3	2	3	4	−1	6	

Source: RSSSF

11 March 2008	Safa (Lebanon)	1–0	(India) East Bengal	Sports City Stadium, Beirut
18:00 UTC+3	Bernard Mbassi 17'	Report		Attendance: 700; Referee: (Oman) Mahmood Mohd Juma Al Ghatrifi

18 March 2008	East Bengal (India)	1–0	(Yemen) Al-Ahli San‘a’	Salt Lake Stadium, Kolkata
15:00 UTC+5:30	Edmilson Marques Pardal 31'	Report		Attendance: 6,000; Referee: (Japan) Minoru Tōjō

3 April 2008	Al-Wahdat (Jordan)	0–2	(India) East Bengal	Prince Mohammad Stadium, Zarqa
15:30 UTC+3		Report	Alvito D'Cunha 58'; Ikechukwu Gift Ibe 69'	Attendance: 4,000; Referee: (Malaysia) Rosdi Shaharul

16 April 2008	East Bengal (India)	2–4	(Jordan) Al-Wahdat	Salt Lake Stadium, Kolkata
15:00 UTC+5:30	Syed Rahim Nabi 12'; Edmilson Marques Pardal 28'	Report	Ra'fat Ali 6' 24'; Hassan Abdel Fattah 31' 34'	Attendance: 10,000; Referee: (Vietnam) Vo Minh Tri

30 April 2008	East Bengal (India)	0–0	(Lebanon) Safa	Salt Lake Stadium, Kolkata, India
15:00 UTC+5:30		(Report)		Attendance: 10,000; Referee: (Uzbekistan) Valentin Kovalenko

14 May 2008	Al-Ahli San‘a’ (Yemen)	1 –0	(India) East Bengal	Ali Mohsen Al-Muraisi Stadium, Sana'a
16:15 UTC+3	Ali Al Nono 43'	(Report)		Attendance: 1,000; Referee: (Tajikistan) Dilovarshokh Orzuev

=== 2010 AFC Cup ===
East Bengal FC qualified for the 2010 AFC Cup after winning the 2009–10 Federation Cup in Guwahati. They were placed in Group D alongside Al-Ittihad of Syria, Al-Nejmeh of Lebanon and Al-Qadsia of Kuwait. East Bengal FC however, could not win any of the matches in the group stage as they finished last without any points and were eliminated.

==== Group stage ====
Team	Pld	W	D	L	GF	GA	GD	Pts	QAD	ITT	NEJ	EB
(Kuwait) Al-Qadsia	6	4	2	0	14	5	+9	14		3–0	1–1	4–1
(Syria) Al-Ittihad	6	3	1	2	10	8	+2	10	0–0		4–2	2–1
(Lebanon) Al-Nejmeh	6	3	1	2	12	8	+4	10	1–3	1–0		3–0
(India) Kingfisher East Bengal	6	0	0	6	5	20	−15	0	2–3	1–4	0–4	

Source: RSSSF
Legend: Blue = home team win; Yellow = draw; Red = away team win.

10 March 2010	East Bengal (India)	1–4	(Syria) Al-Ittihad	Salt Lake Stadium, Kolkata
15:00 (UTC+5:30)	Yakubu 56' (pen.)	Report	Otobong 8'; Al Agha 29', 89'; Al Salal 90+1'	Attendance: 2,800; Referee: Võ Minh Trí (Vietnam)

17 March 2010	Al-Nejmeh (Lebanon)	3–0	(India) East Bengal	Camille Chamoun Stadium, Beirut
18:00 (UTC+2)	Diop 19'; Atwi 23'; Najjarin 48' (pen.)	Report		Attendance: 3,000; Referee: Mohd Nafeez Bin Abdul Wahab (Malaysia)

24 March 2010	East Bengal (India)	2–3	(Kuwait) Al-Qadsia	Salt Lake Stadium, Kolkata
15:00 (UTC+5:30)	Singh 27'; Yakubu 68'	Report	Al-Mutwa 2', 85'; Al-Hussain 20'	Attendance: 1,000; Referee: Saleem Ali (Maldives)

6 April 2010	Al-Qadsia (Kuwait)	4–1	(India) East Bengal	Al-Hamad Stadium, Hawally
18:30 (UTC+3)	Al-Magmed 30'; Mashaan 36'; Ajab 37'; Al-Mutwa 85'	Report	Hossain 59'	Attendance: 2,000; Referee: Fan Qi (China PR)

20 April 2010	Al-Ittihad (Syria)	2–1	(India) East Bengal	Aleppo International Stadium, Aleppo
16:00 (UTC+3)	Kalasi 14'; Rashid 58'	Report	Beokhokhei 78'	Attendance: 3,000; Referee: Yadollah Jahanbazi (Iran)

27 April 2010	East Bengal (India)	0–4	(Lebanon) Al-Nejmeh	Salt Lake Stadium, Kolkata
15:00 (UTC+5:30)		Report	Atwi 3', 41'; Cisse 36'; Najarin 68'	Attendance: 1,500; Referee: Pandian Palaniyandi (Singapore)

=== 2011 AFC Cup ===
East Bengal qualified for the 2011 AFC Cup after winning the 2010 Federation Cup. They were placed in Group H alongside Chonburi of Thailand, Persipura Jayapura of Indonesia and South China of Hong Kong. In the opening match of the group, East Bengal faced Chonburi at home and in a thriller contest managed to secure a 4–4 draw after Tolgay Ozbey scored twice early to put East Bengal ahead only to concede four goals in succession and finally made a comeback with goals from Baljit Sahni and Ravinder Singh to equalise the match and share points. East Bengal lost the second match 4–1 to Persipura Jayapura away at Jakarta. Tolgay scored the only goal for the team. East Bengal lost again in the third match 1–0 against South China away at Hong Kong. In the fourth match, East Bengal managed a 3–3 draw against South China at the Barabati Stadium, courtesy of a last-minute equaliser from Tolgay to share points from the game. East Bengal lost 4–0 against Chonburi in the penultimate game of the group stage away at Chonburi. In the last match of the group stage, East Bengal drew 1–1 against Persipura Jayapura at home to end their campaign with three home draws and three away defeats as they finished at the bottom of the group with three points.

==== Group stage ====
Team	Pld	W	D	L	GF	GA	GD	Pts	CHO	PJY	SCA	KEB
(Thailand) Chonburi	6	4	1	1	18	8	+10	13		4–1	3–0	4–0
(Indonesia) Persipura Jayapura	6	3	2	1	14	9	+5	11	3–0		4–2	4–1
(Hong Kong) South China	6	1	2	3	7	14	−7	5	0–3	1–1		1–0
(India) Kingfisher East Bengal	6	0	3	3	9	17	−8	3	4–4	1–1	3–3	

Source: RSSSF
Legend: Blue = home team win; Yellow = draw; Red = away team win.

2 March 2011	East Bengal (India)	4–4	(Thailand) Chonburi	Salt Lake Stadium, Kolkata
17:00 UTC+05:30	Ozbey 8', 22'; Sahni 74'; R. Singh 82' (pen.)	Report	Pipob 29', 47'; Adul 43'; Ekaphan 53'	Attendance: 2,000; Referee: Hettikamkanamge Perera (Sri Lanka)

16 March 2011	Persipura Jayapura (Indonesia)	4–1	(India) East Bengal	Gelora Bung Karno Stadium, Jakarta
16:00 UTC+07:00	Bonai 16'; B. Solossa 19'; Bonsapia 62'; Mandowen 90+3'	Report	Ozbey 22'	Attendance: 700; Referee: Vo Minh Tri (Vietnam)

13 April 2011	South China (Hong Kong)	1–0	(India) East Bengal	Hong Kong Stadium, Hong Kong
20:00 UTC+08:00	Kežman 69'	Report		Attendance: 7,366; Referee: Sgt. Win Cho (Myanmar)

26 April 2011	East Bengal (India)	3–3	(Hong Kong) South China	Barabati Stadium, Cuttack^{8}
15:00 UTC+05:30	Ozbey 20', 90+4' (pen.); Sahni 69'	Report	Kwok Kin Pong 58'; Cheng Lai Hin 87'; Li Haiqiang 90+3'	Attendance: 3,000; Referee: Kadhum Auda (Iraq)

3 May 2011	Chonburi (Thailand)	4–0	(India) East Bengal	IPE Chonburi Stadium, Chonburi
19:00 UTC+07:00	Ney Fabiano 45+1'; Therdsak 49'; Pipob 51', 69'	Report		Attendance: 6,897; Referee: Fan Qi (China P.R.)

10 May 2011	East Bengal (India)	1–1	(Indonesia) Persipura Jayapura	Salt Lake Stadium, Kolkata
17:00 UTC+05:30	Sahni 46'	Report	Bonai 3'	Attendance: 400; Referee: Ali Shaban (Kuwait)

=== 2012 AFC Cup ===
East Bengal qualified for the 2012 AFC Cup after finishing runner-up of the 2010–11 I-League, as Salgaocar had won both the I-League and Federation Cup. This was their sixth and third successive qualification into the AFC Cup. East Bengal was placed in Group B alongside Al-Oruba of Yemen, Kazma of Kuwait and Arbil of Iraq. East Bengal suffered a disastrous campaign as they lost all six of their group stage matches against the strong West–Asian opponents and was thus eliminated from the tournament after finishing bottom of the group without any points.

==== Group stage ====
Team	Pld	W	D	L	GF	GA	GD	Pts	ERB	KAZ	ORU	KEB
(Iraq) Erbil	6	4	2	0	11	5	+6	14		1–1	2–1	2–0
(Kuwait) Kazma	6	3	2	1	10	6	+4	11	1–2		1–1	3–0
(Yemen) Al-Oruba	6	2	2	2	10	8	+2	8	2–2	1–2		4–1
(India) East Bengal	6	0	0	6	2	14	−12	0	0–2	1–2	0–1	

Source: RSSSF
Legend: Blue = home team win; Yellow = draw; Red = away team win.

==== Matches ====
Win Draw Loss

6 March 2012 Group stage	East Bengal (India)	0–1	(Yemen) Al-Oruba	Kolkata, India
15:00 UTC+05:30		Report	Alao 45+1' (pen.)	Stadium: Salt Lake Stadium; Attendance: 10,000; Referee: Tayeb Hasan Shamsuzzaman (Bangladesh)

20 March 2012 Group stage	Kazma (Kuwait)	3–0	(India) East Bengal	Kuwait City, Kuwait
18:30 UTC+03:00	Nasser 38'; Al Wuhaib 44'; Jammeh 58'	Report		Stadium: Al-Sadaqua Stadium; Attendance: 1,000; Referee: Marai Al Awaji (Saudi Arabia)

4 April 2012 Group stage	East Bengal (India)	0–2	(Iraq) Arbil	Kolkata, India
15:15 UTC+05:30		Report	Radhi 76'; Al Hussain 90+4'	Stadium: Salt Lake Stadium; Attendance: 10,000; Referee: Leow Thiam Hoe (Singapore)

10 April 2012 Group stage	Arbil (Iraq)	2–0	(India) East Bengal	Erbil, Iraq
18:00 UTC+03:00	Al Hussain 45+1' (pen.), 47' (pen.)	Report		Stadium: Franso Hariri Stadium; Attendance: 5,000; Referee: Ali Sabbagh (Lebanon)

25 April 2012 Group stage	Al-Oruba (Yemen)	4–1	(India) East Bengal	Zarqa, Jordan
16:00 UTC+03:00	Duke 6', 34'; Sharyan 59'; Al-Gabr 71'	Report	Edmilson 78'	Stadium: Prince Mohammed Stadium; Attendance: 600; Referee: Khurram Shahzad (Pakistan)

9 May 2012 Group stage	East Bengal (India)	1–2	(Kuwait) Kazma	Kolkata, India
15:30 UTC+05:30	Edmilson 18'	Report	Al Ajmi 8'; Al Azmi 90+1'	Stadium: Salt Lake Stadium; Attendance: 1,000; Referee: Kim Sang-Woo (Korea Republic)

=== 2013 AFC Cup ===
East Bengal qualified for the 2013 AFC Cup after winning the 2012 Federation Cup. This was their seventh appearance in the AFC Cup and fourth in succession since 2009–10. East Bengal was grouped with Selangor of Malaysia, Tampines Rovers of Singapore and Sai Gon Xuan Thanh of Vietnam in Group H. In the opening game, East Bengal defeated Selangor 1–0 at home courtesy of a solitary strike from Lalrindika Ralte in the first half. East Bengal played Sai Gon Xuan Thanh in the next match away in Ho Chi Minh City and drew 0–0. In the third match, East Bengal defeated Tampines Rovers 4–2 away from home with Australian forward Andrew Barisic scoring twice while Chidi Edeh scored one and the other came as an own-goal. East Bengal won against Rovers again in the next match at home by 2–1 with goals from Chidi Edeh and Lalrindika Ralte. East Bengal drew 2–2 against Selangor in the fifth match away in Shah Alam. Penn Orji and Lalrindika Ralte scored for the team. In the last match of the group stage, East Bengal defeated Sai Gon Xuan Thanh 4–1 with Penn Orji netting a brace, Chidi and Barisic netting one each. East Bengal topped the group with four wins and two draws without any defeats and confirmed a pre-quarterfinal fixture at home against Yangon United. On 15 May, East Bengal defeated Yangon United 5–1 at the Salt Lake Stadium with Chidi Edeh scoring a hattrick for the team while Penn Orji and Mehtab Hossain scored one each as East Bengal reached the quarter-finals. East Bengal coach Trevor Morgan resigned and Brazilian coach Marcos Falopa took charge. East Bengal was drawn against Semen Padang of Indonesia in the quarter-finals. In the first leg at home, on 17 September, East Bengal won 1–0 courtesy of a second-half goal from Japanese forward Ryuji Sueoka. In the return leg, on 24 September, East Bengal made history as they drew 1–1 against Semen Padang with James Moga equalising for the team in the second half and secured a place in the AFC Cup semi-final, the second Indian team to do so. East Bengal managed to remain undefeated in the tournament until the semi-finals, where they were drawn against the defending champions Al-Kuwait. On 1 October, East Bengal played the first leg in Kuwait City and lost 4–2. Uga Okpara and Lalrindika Ralte scored for the team. On 22 October, East Bengal faced Kuwait for the return leg at the Salt Lake Stadium in front of a record 50,000 crowd. However, East Bengal was defeated 3–0 by the eventual champions and thus ended their journey in the tournament.

==== Group stage ====
Team	Pld	W	D	L	GF	GA	GD	Pts	KEB	SEL	SG	TPR
(India) East Bengal	6	4	2	0	13	6	+7	14		1–0	4–1	2–1
(Malaysia) Selangor	6	2	2	2	12	11	+1	8	2–2		3–1	3–3
(Vietnam) Sài Gòn Xuân Thành	6	2	2	2	9	12	−3	8	0–0	2–1		2–2
(Singapore) Tampines Rovers	6	0	2	4	12	17	−5	2	2–4	2–3	2–3	

Source: RSSSF
Legend: Blue = home team win; Yellow = draw; Red = away team win.

==== Matches ====
Win Draw Loss

27 February 2013 Group stage	East Bengal (India)	1–0	(Malaysia) Selangor	Kolkata, India
15:00 UTC+5:30	Ralte 43'	Report		Stadium: Salt Lake Stadium; Attendance: 3,000; Referee: Tayeb Shamsuzzaman (Bangladesh)

13 March 2013 Group stage	Sai Gon Xuan Thanh (Vietnam)	0–0	(India) East Bengal	Ho Chi Minh City, Vietnam
18:30 UTC+7		Report		Stadium: Thống Nhất Stadium; Attendance: 5,000; Referee: Ko Hyung-Jin (Korea Republic)

3 April 2013 Group stage	Tampines Rovers (Singapore)	2–4	(India) East Bengal	Jalan Besar, Singapore
19:45 UTC+8	Hadžibulić 28'; Amri 65'	Report	Hadee 19' (o.g.); Barisic 62', 87'; Edeh 64'	Stadium: Jalan Besar Stadium; Attendance: 1,082; Referee: Chaiya Mahapab (Thailand)

9 April 2013 Group stage	East Bengal (India)	2–1	(Singapore) Tampines Rovers	Kolkata, India
15:15 UTC+5:30	Edeh 22'; Ralte 86'	Report	Esah 68'	Stadium: Salt Lake Stadium; Attendance: 7,000; Referee: Nivon Robesh Gamini (Sri Lanka)

23 April 2013 Group stage	Selangor (Malaysia)	2–2	(India) East Bengal	Shah Alam, Malaysia
20:45 UTC+8	Shukur 79'; Adib 90+3'	Report	Orji 23'; Ralte 54'	Stadium: Shah Alam Stadium; Attendance: 1,000; Referee: Ng Kai Lam (Hong Kong)

30 April 2013 Group stage	East Bengal (India)	4–1	(Vietnam) Sai Gon Xuan Thanh	Kolkata, India
16:30 UTC+5:30	Edeh 8' (pen.); Barisic 45'; Orji 53', 59'	Report	Amougou 61'	Stadium: Salt Lake Stadium; Attendance: 2,500; Referee: Fahad Al-Mirdasi (Saudi Arabia)

15 May 2013 Round of 16	East Bengal (India)	5–1	(Myanmar) Yangon United	Kolkata, India
18:00 UTC+5:30	Orji 2'; Edeh 25', 72', 77'; Hossain 48'	Report	César 79'	Stadium: Salt Lake Stadium; Attendance: 8,000; Referee: Minoru Tōjō (Japan)

17 September 2013 Quarter-Final	East Bengal (India)	1–0	(Indonesia) Semen Padang	Kolkata, India
16:30 UTC+5:30	Sueoka 70'	Report		Stadium: Salt Lake Stadium; Attendance: 30,000; Referee: Jumpei Iida (Japan)

24 September 2013 Quarter-Final	Semen Padang (Indonesia)	1–1 (1–2 agg.)	(India) East Bengal	Padang, Indonesia
15:00 UTC+7	Wilson 23'	Report	Moga 78'	Stadium: Haji Agus Salim Stadium; Attendance: 11,350; Referee: Marai Al Awaji (Saudi Arabia)

1 October 2013 Semi-Final	Al-Kuwait	4–2	(India) East Bengal	Kuwait City, Kuwait
19:30 UTC+3	Jemâa 17', 33'; Ali 32'; Hammami 48'	Report	Okpara 65'; Ralte 87'	Stadium: Al Kuwait Stadium; Attendance: 1,000; Referee: Tan Hai (China PR)

22 October 2013 Semi-Final	East Bengal (India)	0–3 (2–7 agg.)	Al-Kuwait	Kolkata, India
16:00 UTC+5:30		Report	Rogerinho 43'; Khamis 44'; Das 87' (o.g.)	Stadium: Salt Lake Stadium; Attendance: 50,000; Referee: Strebre Delovski (Australia)

=== 2015 AFC Cup ===
East Bengal qualified for the 2015 AFC Cup after finishing runner-up in the 2013–14 I-League. (Note: East Bengal entered the AFC Cup instead of Churchill Brothers, the 2013–14 Indian Federation Cup winners.) This was their eighth qualification into the AFC Cup. They were placed in Group F alongside Johor Darul Ta'zim of Malaysia, Kitchee of Hong Kong and Balestier Khalsa of Singapore. In the opening game, East Bengal lost 4–1 against Johor Darul Ta'zim away at Johor Bahru. Ranti Martins scored the only goal for the team. In the second game, East Bengal drew 1–1 against Kitchee, the champions of 2014–15 Hong Kong Premier League. Ranti Martins scored again for the team. In the third match, East Bengal lost 2–1 against Balestier Khalsa away in Singapore. East Bengal however, came back strong in the fourth match when they faced Balestier Khalsa again at home and won 3–0 with goals from Baldeep Singh, Ranti martins and an own-goal from Khalsa defender Nurullah Hussein. In the fifth match, East Bengal lost 1–0 at home to Johor Darul Ta'zim and in the last match of the group stage, East Bengal drew 2–2 against Kitchee away at Hong Kong with goals from Ranti Martins and Cavin Lobo as East Bengal finished third in the group with five points and were eliminated from the tournament.

==== Group stage ====
Pos	Team	Pld	W	D	L	GF	GA	GD	Pts	Qualification
1	(Malaysia) Johor Darul Ta'zim	6	5	0	1	11	3	+8	15	Advance to knockout stage
2	(Hong Kong) Kitchee	6	3	2	1	10	6	+4	11	Advance to knockout stage
3	(India) East Bengal	6	1	2	3	8	10	−2	5	
4	(Singapore) Balestier Khalsa	6	1	0	5	3	13	−10	3	

Source: AFC
Rules for classification: Group stage tiebreakers

==== Matches ====
Win Draw Loss

24 February 2015 Group stage	Johor Darul Ta'zim (Malaysia)	4–1	(India) East Bengal	Johor Bahru, Malaysia
20:45 UTC+8	Nazrin 9'; Safiq 38' (pen.); Suppiah 47'; Safee 53'	Report	Martins 35'	Stadium: Larkin Stadium; Attendance: 12,212; Referee: Sivakorn Pu-Udom (Thailand)

10 March 2015 Group stage	East Bengal (India)	1–1	(Hong Kong) Kitchee	Kolkata, India
18:00 UTC+5:30	Martins 74'	Report	Belencoso 30'	Stadium: Salt Lake Stadium; Attendance: 3,501; Referee: Hiroyuki Kimura (Japan)

17 March 2015 Group stage	Balestier Khalsa (Singapore)	2–1	(India) East Bengal	Jalan Besar, Singapore
20:00 UTC+8	Jonathan Xu 6'; Krištić 19'	Report	Omagbemi 82'	Stadium: Jalan Besar Stadium; Attendance: 1,215; Referee: Kao Jung-fang (Chinese Taipei)

14 April 2015 Group stage	East Bengal (India)	3–0	(Singapore) Balestier Khalsa	Kolkata, India
18:00 UTC+5:30	B. Singh 22'; Hussein 71' (o.g.); Martins 75'	Report		Stadium: Salt Lake Stadium; Attendance: 1,500; Referee: Kim Dae-yong (South Korea)

28 April 2015 Group stage	East Bengal (India)	0–1	(Malaysia) Johor Darul Ta'zim	Kolkata, India
18:00 UTC+5:30		Report	Gaikwad 6' (o.g.)	Stadium: Salt Lake Stadium; Attendance: 100; Referee: Nivon Robesh Gamini (Sri Lanka)

12 May 2015 Group stage	Kitchee (Hong Kong)	2–2	(India) East Bengal	Kowloon, Hong Kong
20:35 UTC+8	Lam Ka Wai 15'; Xu Deshuai 59'	Report	Martins 80'; Lobo 89'	Stadium: Mong Kok Stadium; Attendance: 1,372; Referee: Yousef Al-Marzouq (Kuwait)

== AFC Champions League Two ==
The AFC Champions League Two is an annual continental club football competition organised by the Asian Football Confederation. It is the second-tier competition of Asian club football, ranked below the AFC Champions League Elite and above the AFC Challenge League. The tournament was founded in 2004 as the AFC Cup, which was played primarily among clubs from nations that did not receive direct qualifying slots to the top-tier AFC Champions League. In 2024, the AFC introduced a revamped second-tier club competition under the name AFC Champions League Two, with the records and statistics of the AFC Cup transferring to the new competition.

=== 2024–25 AFC Champions League Two ===
East Bengal qualified for the 2024–25 AFC Champions League Two preliminary round after becoming champions of the 2024 Super Cup. East Bengal faced Altyn Asyr of Turkmenistan in the preliminary round match on 14 August 2024 at the Salt Lake Stadium in a single-legged playoff match, with the winners progressing into the AFC Champions League Two group stages while the losers would progress to the 2024–25 AFC Challenge League group stage. East Bengal lost 2–3 in the play-off match and got a spot in the AFC Challenge League Group Stages.

==== Matches ====
Win Draw Loss Void

14 August 2024 Preliminary round	(India) East Bengal	2–3	(Turkmenistan) Altyn Asyr	Kolkata
19:00 IST	David 7'; Crespo 59'	Report	Myrat 18'; Selim Nurmuradow 28'; Mihail 52'	Stadium: Salt Lake Stadium; Attendance: 27,892; Referee: (Australia) Alexander King

=== 2026–27 AFC Champions League Two ===
East Bengal qualified for the 2026–27 AFC Champions League Two preliminary round after becoming champions of the 2025–26 Indian Super League. East Bengal faced the runner-up of the 2025–26 Kuwaiti Premier League: Al-Arabi in the preliminary round match on 12 August 2026 as the Salt Lake Stadium in a single-legged playoff match and defeated the Kuwaiti side 4–1 in an historic win to secure their place in the AFC Champions League Two group stages. On 18 August, the draw for the group stage took place and East Bengal was drawn in Group D alongside – Al-Hussein of Jordan, Al-Shorta of Iraq and Al-Seeb of Oman.

On 16 September, East Bengal started their AFC Champions League Two group stage campaign against Jordanian champions Al-Hussein away at the Amman International Stadium in Amman, Jordan and drew 2–2 to earn the first point for any Indian club in the AFC Champions League Two tournament since its rebranding in 2024. On 13 October, East Bengal faced Al-Shorta at home at the Salt Lake Stadium and suffered a 2–3 defeat. On 27 October, East Bengal travelled to Oman to face Al Seeb and returned with a point after a goalless draw. On 3 November, East Bengal again faced Al Seeb at home and suffered a 0–2 defeat.

==== Preliminary Round ====
Win Draw Loss Void

12 August 2026 Preliminary round	(India) East Bengal	4–1 (a.e.t.)	(Kuwait) Al-Arabi	Kolkata
19:00 IST	Gupta 90'; Rashid 108'; Lalhlansanga 117'; Danu 120'	AFC Report; GSA Report	Iwuala 76' (pen.)	Stadium: Salt Lake Stadium; Attendance: 17,567; Referee: Sadullo Gulmurodi (Tajikistan)

==== Group Stage ====
Pos	Team	Pld	W	D	L	GF	GA	GD	Pts	Qualification	SHO	HUS	SEE	EBG
1	(Iraq) Al-Shorta (A)	4	3	1	0	8	3	+5	10	Advance to round of 16	—	1–1	1–0	–
2	(Jordan) Al-Hussein	4	1	2	1	6	6	0	5	Advance to round of 16	0–3	—	–	2–2
3	(Oman) Al-Seeb	4	1	1	2	2	4	−2	4		–	0–3	—	0–0
4	(India) East Bengal	4	0	2	2	4	7	−3	2		2–3	–	0–2	—

Updated to match(es) played on 3 November 2026. Source: ACL2
Rules for classification: Tiebreakers
(A) Advance to a further round

==== Matches ====
Win Draw Loss Void

16 September 2026 Group stage	Al-Hussein (Jordan)	2–2	(India) East Bengal	Amman, Jordan
21:30 IST	Al-Haj (yellow card) 49'; Al-Mardi 61'; Assaf 87'	AFC Report; GSA Report	Ramírez 9'; Ali 40'; Jeakson (yellow card) 77'	Stadium: Amman International Stadium; Attendance: 1,645; Referee: Ahmad Alaeddin (Lebanon); Man of the Match: Al-Mardi (Al Hussein)

13 October 2026 Group stage	East Bengal (India)	2–3	(Iraq) Al-Shorta	Kolkata, India
19:15 IST	Lalhlansanga 8', 40' (yellow card) 47'; Bhatt (yellow card) 69'	AFC Report; GSA Report	Yahya 14'; Al-Saedi 51'; Kuku 53'	Stadium: Salt Lake Stadium; Attendance: 12,765; Referee: Majed Al-Shamrani (Saudi Arabia)

27 October 2026 Group stage	Al-Seeb (Oman)	0–0	(India) East Bengal	Seeb, Oman
21:30 IST	Khamis (yellow card) 48'	AFC Report; GSA Report	Gupta (yellow card) 11'; Kumar (yellow card) 61'; Lalrindika (yellow card) 67'	Stadium: Al Seeb Stadium; Referee: Alex King (Australia)

3 November 2026 Group stage	East Bengal (India)	0–2	(Oman) Al-Seeb	Kolkata, India
19:15 IST	Jeakson (yellow card) 22'; Lalchungnunga (yellow card) 36'; Ramírez (yellow card) 90+2'	AFC Report; GSA Report	Oladapo (yellow card) 14'; Méyé 85'; Al-Aghbari 90+1'	Stadium: Salt Lake Stadium; Attendance: 11,735; Referee: Thoriq Alkatiri (Indonesia)

24 November 2026 Group stage	East Bengal (India)	–	(Jordan) Al-Hussein	Kolkata, India
--:-- IST		[ AFC Report] [ GSA Report]		Stadium: Salt Lake Stadium

8 December 2026 Group stage	Al-Shorta (Iraq)	–	(India) East Bengal	Baghdad, Iraq
--:-- IST		[ AFC Report] [ GSA Report]		Stadium: Al-Zawraa Stadium

== AFC Challenge League ==
The AFC Challenge League is an annual continental club football competition organised by the Asian Football Confederation. The competition is played among clubs from nations that did not receive direct qualifying slots to the top-tier AFC Champions League Elite or the second-tier AFC Champions League Two, based on the AFC club competitions ranking.

=== 2024–25 AFC Challenge League ===
East Bengal lost against Altyn Asyr in the preliminary round play-off match 3–2 at the Salt Lake Stadium on 14 August 2024 and got a direct entry into the group stage of the 2024–25 AFC Challenge League. On 22 August, the group stage draw was held at Kuala Lumpur, Malaysia and East Bengal was grouped in Group A along with hosts Paro from Bhutan, Bashundhara Kings from Bangladesh and Nejmeh from Lebanon with all matches of the group stage being played at the Changlimithang Stadium in Thimphu, Bhutan. On 26 October, East Bengal opened their campaign with a 2–2 draw against host Paro with Madih Talal and Dimitrios Diamantakos scoring for East Bengal. On 29 October, East Bengal faced Basundhara Kings and won 4–0 with goals from Dimitrios Diamantakos, Souvik Chakrabarti, Nandhakumar Sekar and Anwar Ali. On 1 November, East Bengal faced the Lebanon champions Nejmeh in a must win tie and won 3–2 with Dimitrios Diamantakos scoring a brace apart from an own goal from Baba Abdulai Musah as East Bengal finished top of the table to qualify for the quarter-finals of the tournament.

==== Group stage ====
Pos	Team	Pld	W	D	L	GF	GA	GD	Pts	Qualification	EAB	NJM	PAR	BSK
1	(India) East Bengal	3	2	1	0	9	4	+5	7	Advance to Quarter-finals		3–2	2–2	
2	(Lebanon) Nejmeh	3	2	0	1	5	4	+1	6					1–0
3	(Bhutan) Paro (H)	3	1	1	1	5	5	0	4			1–2		
4	(Bangladesh) Bashundhara Kings	3	0	0	3	1	7	−6	0		0–4		1–2	

Source: AFC
(H) Hosts

==== Knockout stage ====
Quarter-finals
E2	(Cambodia) Svay Rieng	6	1	7
D1	(Myanmar) Shan United	2	2	4
East Region
D2	(Chinese Taipei) Tainan City	0	0	0
E1	(Indonesia) Madura United	0	3	3
B2	(Kuwait) Al-Arabi (a.e.t.)	1	2	3
C1	(Oman) Al-Seeb	0	2	2
West Region
A1	(India) East Bengal	0	1	1
B1	(Turkmenistan) Arkadag	1	2	3

Semi-finals
(Cambodia) Svay Rieng	3	3	6
(Indonesia) Madura United	0	3	3
(Kuwait) Al-Arabi	2	0	2
(Turkmenistan) Arkadag	0	3	3

Final
(Cambodia) Svay Rieng	1
(Turkmenistan) Arkadag (a.e.t.)	2

==== Matches ====
Win Draw Loss Void

26 October 2024 Group stage	East Bengal (India)	2–2	(Bhutan) Paro	Thimphu, Bhutan
16:30 IST	Talal 5'; Diamantakos 69'	Report	Opoku 9' (pen.); Evans Asante 45+4'	Stadium: Changlimithang Stadium; Attendance: 3,800; Referee: (Jordan) Md. Mofeed Ghabayen

29 October 2024 Group stage	Bashundhara Kings (Bangladesh)	0–4	(India) East Bengal	Thimphu, Bhutan
20:30 IST		Report	Diamantakos 1'; Chakrabarti 20'; Sekar 26'; Ali 33'	Stadium: Changlimithang Stadium; Attendance: 200; Referee: (Bahrain) Mohamed Khaled Tarrar Deham

1 November 2024 Group stage	East Bengal (India)	3–2	(Lebanon) Nejmeh	Thimphu, Bhutan
16:30 IST	Musah 8' (o.g.); Diamantakos 15', 77' (pen.)	Report	Collins Opare 18'; Hussain Monther 43'	Stadium: Changlimithang Stadium; Attendance: 437; Referee: (Thailand) Songkran Bunmeekiart

5 March 2025 Quarter-final	East Bengal (India)	0–1	(Turkmenistan) Arkadag	Kolkata, India
19:00 IST	Messi Bouli (yellow card) 41'; Yuste (yellow card) 57'; Cleiton (yellow card) 89'	Report	Gurbanow 10'; Hojayev (yellow card) 44'; Ballakow (yellow card) 79'; Atayew (yellow card) 89'	Stadium: Salt Lake Stadium; Attendance: 25,497; Referee: (Qatar) Mohammed Ahmed Al Shammari

12 March 2025 Quarter-final	Arkadag (Turkmenistan)	2–1	(India) East Bengal	Arkadag, Turkmenistan
16:00 IST	Durdyýew (yellow card) 41'; Rejebow (yellow card) 45'; Saparow (yellow card) 55'; Annadurdyýew 89' (pen.), 90+8'; Çaryýew (yellow card) 90+3'; Beknazarow (yellow card) 90+5'	Report	Messi Bouli 1' (yellow card) 57'; Lalchungnunga (yellow card) 11' (yellow-red card) 33'	Stadium: Arkadag Stadium; Referee: (Lebanon) Sheikh Ahmad Alaeddin

== Other International Tournaments ==
=== 1953 World Youth Congress, Bucharest ===
In 1953, after the Calcutta Football League was abandoned midway due to riots in Kolkata, East Bengal club received an invitation to participate in the World Youth Congress held in Bucharest, Romania. The East Bengal team was recommended as the official representative of India by then-president Dr Rajendra Prasad, as the best football club of India, as East Bengal had won the prestigious IFA Shield thrice in a row between 1949–51 and were the holders of the Durand Cup, winning it twice in 1951 and 1952. The East Bengal team led by captain Ahmed Khan and football secretary J.C. Guha, thus became the first Indian team to tour Europe. The club also roped in centre forward M. Thangaraj on loan from Wimco & State team for the tour. In the first match at the World Youth Congress, East Bengal faced Grazer AK of Austria and won 2–0. M. Thangaraj scored both the goals for East Bengal. In the second match, East Bengal defeated Lebanon XI 6–1. M. Thangaraj scored a hattrick, Ahmed Khan, Pansanttom Venkatesh and Masood Fakhri scored one each for East Bengal as they entered the semi-finals where they faced the hosts Romania. East Bengal lost 4–0 in the semi-final and met Germany in the third-place play-off match. They lost 5–2, with Fakhri and Thangaraj, scoring for the team as East Bengal finished fourth in the tournament.

==== Matches ====
Win Draw Loss

6 August 1953 First Round	Grazer AK (Austria)	0–2	(India) East Bengal	Bucharest, Romania
		Report	M Thangaraj (?)	Stadium: Stadionul August 23

9 August 1953 Second Round	Lebanon XI	1–6	(India) East Bengal	Bucharest, Romania
	no information	Report	M Thangaraj (?); Khan (?); Venkatesh (?); Fakhri (?)	Stadium: Stadionul August 23

12 August 1953 Semi-Final	Romania	4–0	(India) East Bengal	Bucharest, Romania
	no information			Stadium: Stadionul August 23

15 August 1953 Third-Place Play-off	Germany	5–2	(India) East Bengal	Bucharest, Romania
	no information		Fakhri (?); M Thangaraj (?)	Stadium: Stadionul August 23

=== 1991 BTC Club Cup, Bangladesh ===
The BTC Club Cup was organised by the Bangladesh Football Federation in aid of cyclone and flood victims in Dhaka, Bangladesh. Six teams, three each from Bangladesh and India participated in the tournament: Brothers Union, Dhaka Mohammedan and Abahani Limited from Bangladesh, East Bengal, Mohun Bagan and Mohammedan Sporting from India. East Bengal was grouped alongside Brothers Union and Dhaka Mohammedan in Group A. In the opening match, East Bengal won 1–0 against Brothers Union with Bikash Panji scoring the solitary goal for the team. In the second match, East Bengal drew 1–1 against Dhaka Mohammedan. Imtiaz Ahmed Nakib scored for the home side while Prasanta Banerjee equalised for East Bengal as they progressed into the Semi-finals where they faced Abahani Limited. Sheikh Mohammad Aslam and Rizvi Karim Rumi scored the two goals for Abahani as East Bengal lost 2–1 and were eliminated from the tournament. Krishanu Dey scored a late consolation for East Bengal in the match.

==== Group stage ====
Pos	Team	Pld	W	D	L	GF	GA	GD	Pts	Qualification
1	(Bangladesh) Dhaka Mohammedan	2	1	1	0	5	2	+3	4	Advance to Semi-finals
2	(India) East Bengal	2	1	1	0	2	1	+1	4	Advance to Semi-finals
3	(Bangladesh) Brothers Union	2	0	0	2	1	5	−4	0	

Source: Dhaka Club Cup

==== Bracket ====
Semi-Finals
4 June 1991
(Bangladesh) Abahani Limited	2
(India) East Bengal	1
5 June 1991
(Bangladesh) Dhaka Mohammedan	1
(India) Mohun Bagan	0

Final
8 June 1991
(Bangladesh) Abahani Limited	1
(Bangladesh) Dhaka Mohammedan	0

==== Matches ====
Win Draw Loss

31 May 1991 Group stage	Brothers Union (Bangladesh)	0–1	(India) East Bengal	Dhaka, Bangladesh
			Panji (?)	Stadium: Bangabandhu Stadium

2 June 1991 Group stage	Dhaka Mohammedan (Bangladesh)	1–1	(India) East Bengal	Dhaka, Bangladesh
	Nakib 2'		Banerjee 42'	Stadium: Bangabandhu Stadium

4 June 1991 Semi-Final	Abahani Limited (Bangladesh)	2–1	(India) East Bengal	Dhaka, Bangladesh
	Aslam 22'; Rumi 104'		Dey 25'	Stadium: Bangabandhu Stadium

=== 1993 Wai Wai Cup, Nepal ===
East Bengal participated in the 1993 Wai Wai Cup held in Kathmandu, Nepal led by coach Shyamal Ghosh and captain Ilyas Pasha. East Bengal was grouped alongside RCT, Nepal Youth and Janakpur in the group stages. In the opening match on 5 June, East Bengal defeated RCT 3–0 to start their campaign. Sisir Ghosh scored a brace while Kiron Khongsai scored the third for East Bengal. In the second match, East Bengal drew 1–1 against the Nepal Youth team. Kiron Khongsai scored again for the team while Rajesh Nepali scored for Nepal Youth. In the third match, East Bengal drew again, this time 2–2 against Janakpur with Sisir Ghosh and Sanjay Majhi scoring for the team as they entered the knockout stage. In the semi-final, East Bengal faced Malaysian top division club Terengganu and won 1–0 with a solitary goal from Kiron Khongsai, who scored his third goal in the tournament. In the final, East Bengal faced RCT once again and won 1–0 courtesy of an own-goal by RCT defender Suman Enjon as East Bengal became champions of the tournament, their second title on foreign soil after 1985 Coca-Cola Cup.

==== Matches ====
Win Draw Loss

5 June 1993 Group stage	RCT (Nepal)	0–3	(India) East Bengal	Kathmandu, Nepal
			Ghosh (?); Khongsai (?)	Stadium: Dasarath Stadium

7 June 1993 Group stage	Nepal Youth	1–1	(India) East Bengal	Kathmandu, Nepal
	Nepali (?)		Khongsai (?)	Stadium: Dasarath Stadium

9 June 1993 Group stage	Janakpur (Nepal)	2–2	(India) East Bengal	Kathmandu, Nepal
	Maharajan (?); Dey (?) (o.g.)		Majhi (?); Ghosh (?)	Stadium: Dasarath Stadium

12 June 1993 Semi-Final	Terengganu (Malaysia)	0–1	(India) East Bengal	Kathmandu, Nepal
			Khongsai (?)	Stadium: Dasarath Stadium

15 June 1993 Final	RCT (Nepal)	0–1	(India) East Bengal	Kathmandu, Nepal
			Enjon (?) (o.g.)	Stadium: Dasarath Stadium

=== 1996 Coca-Cola International Cup, Nepal ===
East Bengal received an invitation and participated in the 1996 Coca-Cola International Cup held in Nepal as a part of their pre-season preparation for the 1996–97 National Football League. East Bengal was grouped alongside Sankata Boys and Tribhuvan Club in the group stages. In the first game, East Bengal lost 2–1 against Sankata Boys but came back strong in the next match against Tribhuvan Club to win 2–1 with Tausif Jamal and Latvian attacker Sergei Kutov scoring for the team and securing a place in the Semi-finals. In the Semi-final, however, East Bengal lost 2–0 against Manang Marshyangdi and was eliminated from the tournament.

==== Matches ====
Win Draw Loss

22 September 1996 Group stage	Sankata Boys (Nepal)	2–1	(India) East Bengal	Kathmandu, Nepal
	Bijaya (?); Tulhadar (?)		Tulhadar (?) (o.g.)	Stadium: Dasarath Stadium

24 September 1996 Group stage	Tribhuvan Club (Nepal)	1–2	(India) East Bengal	Kathmandu, Nepal
	Maharjan (?)		Jamal (?); Kutov (?)	Stadium: Dasarath Stadium

27 September 1996 Semi-Final	Manang Marshyangdi (Nepal)	2–0	(India) East Bengal	Kathmandu, Nepal
	Lama (?); Narayan (?)			Stadium: Dasarath Stadium

=== 1996–97 Bangabandhu Cup, Bangladesh ===
In 1996–97, before the start of the National Football League, East Bengal and Mohammedan Sporting from India were invited to participate in the inaugural Bangabandhu Cup held in Dhaka, Bangladesh. A total of twelve teams from different nations participated in the tournament which included hosts Dhaka Mohammedan, Abahani Krira Chakra, Muktijoddha Sangsad from Bangladesh, East Bengal and Mohammedan Sporting from India, Makassar from Indonesia, Bargh Shiraz from Iran, Malaysia Red and Malaysia Blue, Kosmos from Russia, Friends from Nepal and Eastern All-Star from Thailand. East Bengal was grouped alongside Dhaka Mohammedan and Friends Club from Nepal in group B. East Bengal lost both the matches in the group stage, 1–0 to Friends Club and 3–1 to hosts Dhaka Mohammedan and was eliminated from the tournament without a single point.

==== Matches ====
Win Draw Loss

1 January 1997 Group stage	Friends (Nepal)	1–0	(India) East Bengal	Dhaka, Bangladesh
	Tulhadharan (?)			Stadium: Bangabandhu National Stadium

6 January 1997 Group stage	Dhaka Mohammedan (Bangladesh)	3–1	(India) East Bengal	Dhaka, Bangladesh
	Sakan (?); Alfaz (?); Jewel Rana (?)		Vijayan (?)	Stadium: Bangabandhu National Stadium

=== 2003 ASEAN Club Championship, Indonesia ===
The ASEAN Club Championship is an international club football competition between domestic champion clubs sides run by the ASEAN Football Federation. Formerly known as the LG Cup, sponsored by LG Electronics. LG described the competition as a "social marketing experiment". Qualification to the competition was for champions clubs from AFF-affiliated countries only, plus the champions from India in 2003. After winning the 2002–03 National Football League, East Bengal was invited to the inaugural 2003 ASEAN Club Championship held at Jakarta, Indonesia. Top clubs from South-East Asia participated in the tournament which included the favourites BEC Tero Sasana from Thailand who already reached the 2002–03 AFC Champions League Finals. The star-studded team consisted of Golden Ball winner of 2002–03 AFC Champions League: Therdsak Chaiman. Other top teams like 2002 Malaysia Super League Champions Perak FC and Liga Indonesia 2002 Champions Petrokimia Putra participated in the tournament.

East Bengal was grouped alongside BEC Tero Sasana and Philippine Army in Group D. They lost the first match against the favourites BEC Tero Sasana 1–0, courtesy of a solitary goal from Therdsak Chaiman. The Red and Gold brigade bounced back in style as they defeated the Philippine Army 6–0, with Bhaichung Bhutia scoring all 6 goals, becoming the only Indian player to score a double hattrick in an International game to date. In the Quarter Finals, East Bengal faced Persita Tangerang of Indonesia. Goals from Bhaichung and Bijen Singh ensured a 2–1 win for the Kolkata side. Bhaichung was again on the scoresheet when East Bengal faced Petrokimia Putra in the Semi-Final. The score was 1–1 after 120 minutes and the Red and Golds won 7–6 in the shootout. On 26 July 2003, East Bengal made history as they defeated the favourites BEC Tero Sasana 3–1 with goals from Mike Okoro, Bhaichung and Alvito D'Cunha, hence becoming the first Indian club to win a top-level officially recognised tournament in foreign soil. Bhaichung became the top scorer of the tournament with nine goals. Sandip Nandy was adjudged as the Best Goalkeeper of the Tournament.

==== Group stage ====
Team	Pld	W	D	L	GF	GA	GD	Pts
(Thailand) BEC Tero Sasana	2	2	0	0	4	0	+4	6
(India) East Bengal	2	1	0	1	6	1	+5	3
(Philippines) Philippine Army	2	0	0	2	0	9	−9	0

Source: RSSSF

=== Bracket ===
Quarter-Finals
20 July
(Indonesia) Petrokimia Putra (a.e.t.)	3
Singapore AF	2
21 July
(Indonesia) Persita Tangerang	1
(India) East Bengal	2
20 July 2003
(Malaysia) Perak	2
(Cambodia) Samart United	0
21 July
(Thailand) BEC Tero Sasana	2
(Vietnam) Hoàng Anh Gia Lai	1

Semi-Finals
24 July
(Indonesia) Petrokimia Putra	1 (6)
(India) East Bengal (p)	1 (7)
24 July
(Malaysia) Perak	1
(Thailand) BEC Tero Sasana	3

Final
26 July
(India) East Bengal	3
(Thailand) BEC Tero Sasana	1
Third place
26 July
(Indonesia) Petrokimia Putra	3
(Malaysia) Perak	0

===== Matches =====
Win Draw Loss

14 July 2003 Group stage	BEC Tero Sasana (Thailand)	1–0	(India) East Bengal	Jakarta, Indonesia
	Therdsak Chaiman 85'			Stadium: Gelora Bung Karno Stadium

16 July 2003 Group stage	East Bengal (India)	6–0	(Philippines) Philippine Army	Jakarta, Indonesia
	Baichung Bhutia 20' (pen.), 50', 53', 70', 75', 88'			Stadium: Gelora Bung Karno Stadium

21 July 2003 Quarter-final	Persita Tangerang (Indonesia)	1–2	(India) East Bengal	Jakarta, Indonesia
	Ilham Jayakesuma 62'		Baichung Bhutia 53'; Bijen Singh 76'	Stadium: Gelora Bung Karno Stadium

24 July 2003 Semi-final	Petrokimia Putra (Indonesia)	1–1 (a.e.t.) (6–7 p)	(India) East Bengal	Jakarta, Indonesia
	Jaenal Ichwan 23'	Report	Baichung Bhutia 58'	Stadium: Gelora Bung Karno Stadium
	Penalties
	Jaenal Ichwan (penalty scored); Indraju (penalty scored); Pdudu Putra (penalty scored); Daniel Fernando (penalty scored); Sasi Kirono (penalty missed); Chan Jhe (penalty scored); Ekwe (penalty scored); Loko (penalty missed)		(penalty scored) Baichung Bhutia; (penalty scored) Bijen Singh; (penalty scored) Suley Musah; (penalty missed) Shylo Malsawmtluanga; (penalty scored) Chandan Das; (penalty scored) Douglas da Silva; (penalty scored) Surkumar Singh; (penalty scored) Muttah Suresh

26 July 2003 Final	East Bengal (India)	3–1	(Thailand) BEC Tero Sasana	Jakarta, Indonesia
	Mike Okoro 20'; Baichung Bhutia 46'; Alvito D'Cunha 69'		Panai Kongprapun 58'	Stadium: Gelora Bung Karno Stadium; Referee: Jimmy Napitupulu (Indonesia)

=== 2004 Pepsi Max Challenge Cup, England ===
After winning National Football League titles in 2002–03 and 2003–04, East Bengal club tied up with a partnership with Premier League giants Leicester City in 2004. To commemorate the partnership, East Bengal Club was invited to participate in the 120th anniversary quadrangular tournament of Leicester City in England along with Real Mallorca of Spain and Marítimo of Portugal, known as the Pepsi Max Challenge Cup. On 31 July, East Bengal faced Leicester City at the Walkers Stadium, the home of Leicester, and lost 1–0 courtesy of a penalty goal in the sixty-ninth minute by Trevor Benjamin. East Bengal faced Portuguese Primeira Liga side Marítimo in the third-place play-off match the next day and lost 3–0. East Bengal lost both the matches in the tournament but the good-will tour ended on a high note as East Bengal club was felicitated at the House of Commons of the United Kingdom by the deputy Prime Minister John Prescott.

==== Bracket ====
Semi-Finals
31 July 2004
(England) Leicester City	1
(India) East Bengal	0
31 July 2004
(Spain) Real Mallorca	1 (4)
(Portugal) Marítimo	1 (3)

Final
1 August 2004
(England) Leicester City	4
(Spain) Real Mallorca	2
Third place
1 August 2004
(India) East Bengal	0
(Portugal) Marítimo	3

==== Matches ====
Win Draw Loss

31 July 2004 Semi Final	Leicester City (England)	1–0	(India) East Bengal	Leicester, United Kingdom
	Benjamin 69' (pen.)	Report		Stadium: Walkers Stadium

1 August 2004 3rd Place Play-off	Marítimo (Portugal)	3–0	(India) East Bengal	Leicester, United Kingdom
	Eusébio 12'; Fernandes 32' (o.g.); Manduca 69'	Report		Stadium: Walkers Stadium

=== 2004 San Miguel International Cup, Nepal ===
After winning the 2004–05 Calcutta Football League title, East Bengal decided to participate in the invitational San Miguel International Cup held in Kathmandu, Nepal as a part of their pre-season preparation for the 2004–05 National League campaign. The tournament featured six teams which included East Bengal and Tollygunge Agragami from India, Farashganj from Bangladesh, Hannam University from South Korea and two teams from hosts Nepal namely Nepal Red and Nepal Blue. East Bengal was grouped with Nepal Red and Farashgunj in Group A. In the opening game on 25 December, East Bengal lost 1–0 to hosts Nepal Red team. Basanta Thapa scored the only goal in the 78th minute of the game. East Bengal came back strong in the second match as they defeated Farashgunj 2–1 to reach the semi-finals. Chandan Das and Alvito D'Cunha scored for the team. In the semi-final, East Bengal faced Nepal Blue on 31 December and won 1–0 courtesy of a solitary strike from Brazilian forward Paolo Roberto da Silva. In the final, East Bengal faced the South Korean Hannam University team and after 120 minutes, the score remained 0–0 and East Bengal won 4–2 via penalty shoot-out and lifted their fourth trophy on international soil.

==== Group stage ====
Team	Pld	W	D	L	GF	GA	GD	Pts
Nepal Red (Note: Selection of Nepalese players. Effectively a full national team.)	2	1	1	0	1	0	+1	4
(India) East Bengal	2	1	0	1	2	2	0	3
(Bangladesh) Farashganj	2	0	1	1	1	2	−1	1

Source: San Miguel International Cup 2004

==== Bracket ====
Semi-Finals
30 December 2004
Nepal Red	0
(South Korea) Hannam University	2
31 December 2004
Nepal Blue	0
(India) East Bengal	1

Final
1 January 2005
(South Korea) Hannam University	0 (2)
(India) East Bengal	0 (4)

==== Matches ====
Win Draw Loss

25 December 2004 Group stage	Nepal Red	1–0	(India) East Bengal	Kathmandu, Nepal
	Thapa 78'			Stadium: Dasarath Stadium

27 December 2004 Group stage	Farashganj (Bangladesh)	1–2	(India) East Bengal	Kathmandu, Nepal
	Khan 89'		Das 59'; D'Cunha 71'	Stadium: Dasarath Stadium

31 December 2004 Semi-Final	Nepal Blue	0–1	(India) East Bengal	Kathmandu, Nepal
			Paolo 71'	Stadium: Dasarath Stadium

1 January 2005 Final	Hannam University (South Korea)	0–0 (a.e.t.) (2−4 p)	(India) East Bengal	Kathmandu, Nepal
		Report		Stadium: Dasarath Stadium
	Penalties
	Je-hun (penalty scored); Hae-won (penalty scored); Wook (penalty missed); Tae (penalty missed)		(penalty scored) Das; (penalty scored) Paolo; (penalty scored) Douglas; (penalty scored) Lawrence

=== 2011 BTV Becamex IDC Cup, Vietnam ===
After winning the 2010 Federation Cup and becoming runner-up in the 2010–11 I-League, East Bengal club received an invitation to participate in the BTV Becamex IDC Cup in Vietnam and the club accepted the invitation to travel to Thu Dau Mot as a part of the pre-season campaign for the 2011–12 I-League. East Bengal was grouped alongside SHB Da Nang and Sai Gon Xuan Thanh from Vietnam and Matsubara from Brazil in group B. In the opening match, on 7 October, East Bengal drew 2–2 against SHB Da Nang. East Bengal took the lead twice through Khanthang Paite and Reisangmei Vashum but squandered the lead both times as the game ended in a draw. East Bengal suffered another blow as Tolgay Ozbey was shown a red card in the 89th minute of the game. In the second match, East Bengal lost 1–0 to Sai Gon Xuan Thanh as they conceded in the 89th minute. In the last game of the group stage, on 11 October, East Bengal lost once again to Matsubara by 1–0 and ended their campaign with just 1 point from three matches, without any victories.

==== Matches ====
Win Draw Loss

7 October 2011 Group stage	SHB Da Nang (Vietnam)	2–2	(India) East Bengal	Thu Dau Mot, Vietnam
	Quoc Anh 40'; Merlo 88'	Report	Paite 22'; Vashum 52'; Ozbey (red card) 89'	Stadium: Gò Đậu Stadium

9 October 2011 Group stage	East Bengal (India)	0–1	(Vietnam) Sai Gon Xuan Thanh	Thu Dau Mot, Vietnam
	R. Singh (yellow card); Chettri (yellow card); Okpara (yellow card)	Report	Kim 89'	Stadium: Gò Đậu Stadium

11 October 2011 Group stage	East Bengal (India)	0–1	(Brazil) Matsubara	Thu Dau Mot, Vietnam
	Lalthlamuana (yellow card) 7'; Chettri (yellow card) 18'; Vashum (yellow card) 44'	Report	Oliviera 22'	Stadium: Gò Đậu Stadium

=== 2015 Sheikh Kamal International Club Cup, Bangladesh ===
After winning the 2015–16 Calcutta Football League, East Bengal, along with Mohammedan Sporting received an invitation to participate in the inaugural Sheikh Kamal International Club Cup to be held in Chittagong, Bangladesh. East Bengal accepted the invitation and travelled to Bangladesh as a part of their pre-season campaign for the 2015–16 I-League. East Bengal was grouped along with Chittagong Abahani, K-Electric and Dhaka Abahani in Group B. In the opening match, on 20 October, East Bengal defeated the hosts Chittagong Abahani 2–1. Mohammed Rafique and Prohlad Roy scored for East Bengal. In the second match, East Bengal won 3–1 against 2014–15 Pakistan Premier League champions K-Electric with Orok Essien, Mohammed Rafique and Ranti Martins scoring the team. In the last game of the group, East Bengal drew 0–0 with Dhaka Abahani to top the group and reach the semi-finals, where they faced Dhaka Mohammedan. On 28 October, East Bengal defeated Dhaka Mohammedan 3–0 to reach the final of the tournament. Ranti Martins scored twice while Mohammed Rafique scored the other. In the final, on 30 October, East Bengal once again faced the hosts Chittagong Abahani, whom they had defeated in the first game. East Bengal took the lead early after the ball deflected off Rezaul Karim into the net as an own goal from a powerful shot by Avinabo Bag in the eleventh minute. However, the hosts rallied from behind to score thrice, with Eleta Kingsley netting a brace and Hemanta Vincent Biswas scoring the third as East Bengal lost the final 3–1 and finished runner-up.

==== Group stage ====
Pos	Team	Pld	W	D	L	GF	GA	GD	Pts	Qualification
1	(India) East Bengal	3	2	1	0	5	2	+3	7	Advance to Semi-finals
2	(Bangladesh) Chittagong Abahani (H)	3	2	0	1	6	4	+2	6	Advance to Semi-finals
3	(Bangladesh) Dhaka Abahani	3	1	1	1	3	3	0	4	
4	(Pakistan) K-Electric	3	0	0	3	5	10	−5	0	

Source: GSA
(H) Hosts

=== Bracket ===
Semi-finals
A1	(Afghanistan) De Spin Ghar Bazan	1
B2	(Bangladesh) Chittagong Abahani	3
B1	(India) East Bengal	3
A2	(Bangladesh) Mohammedan Dhaka	0

Final
B2	(Bangladesh) Chittagong Abahani	3
B1	(India) East Bengal	1

==== Matches ====
Win Draw Loss

20 October 2015 Group stage	Chittagong Abahani (Bangladesh)	1–2	(India) East Bengal	Chittagong, Bangladesh
19:30 BST	Razaq 78' (o.g.)		Rafique 32'; Roy 72'	Stadium: M. A. Aziz Stadium; Attendance: 12,000; Referee: Harun Gazi

22 October 2015 Group stage	East Bengal (India)	3–1	(Pakistan) K-Electric	Chittagong, Bangladesh
16:30 BST	Essien 15'; Rafique 25'; Martins 49'	Report	Rasool 84'	Stadium: M. A. Aziz Stadium; Attendance: 4,000; Referee: Khalek Sheikh

24 October 2015 Group stage	Dhaka Abahani (Bangladesh)	0–0	(India) East Bengal	Chittagong, Bangladesh
19:30 BST				Stadium: M. A. Aziz Stadium; Attendance: 18,000; Referee: Monir Khan

28 October 2015 Semi-Final	East Bengal (India)	3–0	(Bangladesh) Dhaka Mohammedan	Chittagong, Bangladesh
19:30 BST	Martins 8', 59'; Rafique 48'			Stadium: M. A. Aziz Stadium; Attendance: 18,000; Referee: Farukh Islam

30 October 2015 Final	Chittagong Abahani (Bangladesh)	3–1	(India) East Bengal	Chittagong, Bangladesh
19:30 BST	Kingsley 45+1', 54'; Biswas 57'	Report	Karim 11' (o.g.)	Stadium: M. A. Aziz Stadium; Attendance: 30,000; Referee: Jakir Talukdar

== East Bengal International Tours ==
=== East Bengal Tour of Burma, 1937 ===
Pre-Independence, although they had toured Burma earlier back in 1932, however, then Burma used to be part of the British India, hence this can be traced back as the very first International tour East Bengal club made. Led by captain Dulal Banerjee in the absence of Paresh Majumdar, the East Bengal team along with their manager J. N. Mukherjee traveled to Rangoon in October 1937. At first, they were supposed to play 3 friendly exhibition matches, however, later, on the demands of the crowd, the East Bengal team played five matches in their maiden international tour. East Bengal won two, lost two, and drew the other among the five matches they played in the tour.

On 13 October 1937, East Bengal played their first game against the Burmese XI at the BAA Ground and suffered a heavy defeat by 6–0 to the home side. However, East Bengal came back strong in the second match on 15 October against Burmese XI (Reserves) and won by 2–1 with a brace from N. Majumdar. Fred Pugsley scored the only goal for the home team. In the third match on 18 October, East Bengal avenged their defeat from the first match against the Burmese Xi as they won 4–2. Right-out Samad opened the scoring for East Bengal and then Murgesh scored a brace. The Burmese XI had reduced the margin through a penalty just before halftime from a penalty kick by Wellin, but East Bengal scored once again after the break, through Left-inside forward Joseph to restore the three-goal lead. Ba Thaung scored a late consolation for the home team. East Bengal played two more exhibition games at the request of the Burmese crowd, out of which they lost 1–0 in one game and the other finished goalless as they concluded their tour and returned to Calcutta.

==== Matches ====
Win Draw Loss

13 October 1937 1	Burma XI (Myanmar)	6–0	(British Raj) East Bengal	Rangoon, Burma
	Ba Thaung (?); Wellin (?); Kannuat (?)			Stadium: BAA Ground

15 October 1937 2	Burma XI (Reserves) (Myanmar)	1–2	(British Raj) East Bengal	Rangoon, Burma
	Fred Pugsley (?)		N. Majumdar (?)	Stadium: BAA Ground

18 October 1937 3	Burma XI (Myanmar)	2–4	(British Raj) East Bengal	Rangoon, Burma
	Wellin (?); Ba Thaung (?)		Samad (?); Murgesh (?); Joseph (?)	Stadium: BAA Ground

20 October 1937 4	Burma XI (Myanmar)	1–0	(British Raj) East Bengal	Rangoon, Burma
	? (?)			Stadium: BAA Ground

22 October 1937 5	Burma XI (Myanmar)	0–0	(British Raj) East Bengal	Rangoon, Burma
				Stadium: BAA Ground

=== East Bengal Tour of USSR, 1953 ===
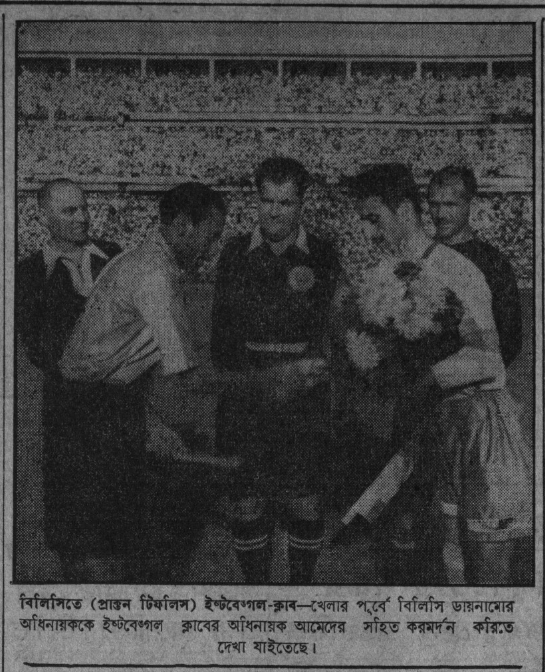
Ahmed Khan, captain of East Bengal and Avtandil Gogoberidze, the captain of Dynamo Tbilisi before the match.

After the great performance at the 1953 World Youth Festival in Bucharest, East Bengal was invited to play a series of games by the Soviet Union. The team travelled directly from Bucharest to Moscow on 19 August and on 21 August, they faced Torpedo Moscow at the Central Dynamo Stadium in Moscow in front of a fully packed stadium. Evgeniy Malov scored in the very first minute for the 1952 Soviet Cup champions and Nikolay Senyukov made it 2–0 in the tenth minute for the hosts. East Bengal team regained their confidence as M. Thangaraj pulled one back in the eighteenth minute and Pansanttom Venkatesh equalised with a brilliantly taken freekick in the twenty-eighth minute. The Torpedo team went ahead again just after the break in the forty-sixth minute courtesy of a goal from Valentin Ivanov but East Bengal managed to equalise once again as Venkatesh found the back of the net in the sixty-fifth minute and East Bengal managed to draw against the Soviet Cup champions 3–3, with half of the team playing barefooted. For the next match, East Bengal travelled to Tbilisi, where they faced the runner-up of the 1953 Soviet Top League, Dynamo Tbilisi. On 25 August, East Bengal played Dynamo Tbilisi at the Lenin Dinamo Stadium in front of a 40,000 packed crowd and suffered a 9–1 defeat. Zaur Kaloev scored four goals while Giorgi Antadze, Revaz Makharadze, Aleksandre Kotrikadze, Konstantin Gagnidze and Yuri Vardimiadi scored one each. M. Thangaraj scored the only goal for East Bengal in the twenty-fifth minute. East Bengal team travelled back to Moscow for their next game on 1 September against 1953 Soviet Cup champions Dynamo Moscow and lost 6–0. The legendary goalkeeper Lev Yashin played in the game against East Bengal. Sergei Korshunov and Konstantin Beskov scored twice, Vladimir Ilyin and Vladimir Ryzhkin scored one each for the Russian champions. The team travelled once again to Kyiv for their last match of the tour where they faced Dynamo Kyiv, the runner-up of the 1952 Soviet Top League. On 6 September, East Bengal played Dynamo Kyiv at the Republican Stadium in front of a 70,000 packed crowd and suffered a 13–1 defeat, the biggest defeat for the club to date. Mykhaylo Koman scored four goals for the Ukrainian giants, Andrei Zazroyev, Pavlo Vinkovatov and Aleksandr Ryzhikov scored a brace each while Mykhaylo Mykhalyna, Viktor Fomin and Volodymyr Bogdanovich scored one each. 20 year old Krishna Kittu scored the only goal for East Bengal in the second half. The East Bengal players could not cope up with the extreme climate of Soviet Russia and the fatigue of the tour took a toll on the players as they lost last three games before returning to India.

==== Matches ====
Win Draw Loss

21 August 1953 1	Torpedo Moscow (Soviet Union)	3–3	(India) East Bengal	Moscow, Soviet Union
17:00 (UTC+3)	Malov 1'; Senyukov 10'; Ivanov 46'	Report	M. Thangaraj 18'; Venkatesh 28', 65'	Stadium: Central Dynamo Stadium; Attendance: 30,000; Referee: (Soviet Union) P. Belov (USSR)

25 August 1953 2	Dynamo Tbilisi (Soviet Union)	9–1	(India) East Bengal	Tbilisi, Soviet Union
18:00 (UTC+4)	Antadze 2'; Kaloev 3', 22', 50', 82'; Makharadze 8'; Kotrikadze 12'; Vardimiadi 80'; Gagnidze 90'	Report	M. Thangaraj 25'	Stadium: Beria Dinamo Stadium; Attendance: 40,000; Referee: (Soviet Union) N. Chkhatarashvili (USSR)

1 September 1953 3	Dynamo Moscow (Soviet Union)	6–0	(India) East Bengal	Moscow, Soviet Union
17:00 (UTC+3)	Korshunov 30', 31'; Beskov 41', 57'; Ilyin 55'; Ryzhkin 72'	Report		Stadium: Central Dynamo Stadium; Attendance: 30,000; Referee: D. Danko (Hungary)

6 September 1953 4	Dynamo Kyiv (Soviet Union)	13–1	(India) East Bengal	Kyiv, Soviet Union
17:00 (UTC+2)	Zazroyev 10' (?); Koman (?); Vinkovatov (?); Ryzhikov (?); Mykhalyna (?); Fomin (?); Bogdanovich (?)	Report	Kittu (?)	Stadium: Republican Stadium; Attendance: 70,000; Referee: (Soviet Union) N. Balakin (USSR)

=== East Bengal Tour of Myanmar, 2009 ===
In 2009, under coach Subhash Bhowmick, East Bengal toured Myanmar in August for a set of friendlies as a part of their pre-season campaign after a heavy training camp in Puri, Odisha. East Bengal travelled to Mandalay to face Yadanarbon on 16 August and suffered a 2–1 defeat in their opening game of the tour. Harmanjot Khabra scored the only goal for East Bengal. East Bengal however, won the next match 3–1 against Yangon United on 19 August in Yangon. Khabra scored once again while Edmilson scored a brace for East Bengal. On 21 August, East Bengal played their third match of the tour against Okktha United and won 1–0 courtesy of a solitary strike from newly signed Argentine forward Omar Sebastián Monesterolo. On 23 August, East Bengal played their last match of the tour against Magwe and held onto a 2–2 draw with Monesterolo and Beikhokhei Beingaichho scoring the team. East Bengal returned to India with two wins, a draw and defeat apiece from four matches in the tour.

==== Matches ====
Win Draw Loss

16 August 2009 Friendly	Yadanarbon (Myanmar)	2–1	(India) East Bengal	Mandalay, Myanmar
	no information	Report	Khabra (?)	Stadium: Bahtoo Stadium

19 August 2009 Friendly	Yangon United (Myanmar)	1–3	(India) East Bengal	Yangon, Myanmar
	no information		Khabra (?); Edmilson (?)	Stadium: Aung San Stadium

21 August 2009 Friendly	Okktha United (Myanmar)	0–1	(India) East Bengal	Yangon, Myanmar
			Monesterolo (?)	Stadium: Aung San Stadium

23 August 2009 Friendly	Magwe (Myanmar)	2–2	(India) East Bengal	Yangon, Myanmar
	no information	Report	Monesterolo (?); Beingaichho (?)	Stadium: Thuwunna Stadium

=== East Bengal Tour of Malaysia, 2018 ===
In 2018, under coach Alejandro Menendez, East Bengal toured to Malaysia in October for their pre-season campaign before the start of the 2018-19 I-League. In a span of 3 weeks, East Bengal trained at the MSN Sports Complex in Kuala Lumpur and played a set of four friendly matches against Malaysia Premier League and Malaysia Super League teams. On 7 October, East Bengal faced UiTM in Shah Alam and won 4–1. Yami Longvah, Enrique Esqueda, Mahmoud Amnah and Jobi Justin scored for East Bengal. East Bengal was supposed to face UKM on 10 October for their next match but due to heavy rainfall and poor ground conditions the match was cancelled. East Bengal faced Malaysian Super Division side Terengganu in their next match on 13 October in Nilai and the match ended 0–0. East Bengal played PDRM in their next match on 17 October and won 6–2. Enrique netted a brace, Surabuddin Mollick, Bidyashagar Singh and Jobby Justin scored one each while the other was an own goal. In their last match on 19 October, East Bengal played UiTM Reserves and won 1–0 courtesy of a goal from Enrique, who scored his fourth goal of the tour. East Bengal finished the tour with three wins and a draw from four matches, while one match was abandoned due to bad weather.

==== Matches ====
Win Draw Loss

7 October 2018 Friendly	UiTM (Malaysia)	1–4	(India) East Bengal	Shah Alam, Malaysia
18:00 IST	28'	Report	Yami Longvah 39'; Enrique Esqueda 45' (pen.); Borja Gomez Perez (yellow card) 60'; Mahmoud Amnah 80' (pen.); Jobi Justin 82'	Stadium: UiTM Stadium; Attendance: 200

10 October 2018 Friendly	UKM (Malaysia)	(ABD)	(India) East Bengal	Nilai, Malaysia
14:30 IST		Abandoned due to bad playing conditions		Stadium: USIM Mini Stadium

13 October 2018 Friendly	Terengganu (Malaysia)	0–0	(India) East Bengal	Nilai, Malaysia
14:30 IST		Report		Stadium: USIM Mini Stadium

17 October 2018 Friendly	PDRM (Malaysia)	2–6	(India) East Bengal	Kuala Lumpur, Malaysia
07:00 IST	Petrișor Voinea 49', 53'	Report	Surabuddin Mollick 30'; Enrique Esqueda 43', 63' ?? (o.g.); Bidyashagar Singh 70'; Jobi Justin 73', 89'	Stadium: MSN Ground

19 October 2018 Friendly	UiTM Reserves (Malaysia)	0–1	(India) East Bengal	Kuala Lumpur, Malaysia
14:15 IST		Report	Enrique Esqueda 30'	Stadium: Sime Darby Field

== Bibliography ==
Books

- Goswami, Ramesh Chandra (1963). East Bengal Cluber Itihas (in Bengali). Kolkata: Book Garden.
- Bandyopadhyay, Santipriya (1979). Cluber Naam East Bengal (in Bengali). Kolkata: New Bengal Press.
- Chattopadhyay, Hariprasad (2017). Mohun Bagan-East Bengal (in Bengali). Kolkata: Parul Prakashan.
- Saha, Rupak (2000). Itihase East Bengal (in Bengali). Kolkata: Deep.
- Saha, Rupak (2020). East Bengal - Prothom Eksho Bochor (in Bengali). Kolkata: The Cafe Table. ISBN 978-93-89873-21-4.
