= 1984–85 Santosh Trophy =

National Football Championship

Tournament details
- Country: India

Final positions
- Champions: Punjab (4th title)
- Runners-up: Maharashtra

Tournament statistics
- Top goal scorer: Kashmira Singh (8 goals)

The 1984–85 Santosh Trophy was the 41st edition of the Santosh Trophy, the main State competition for football in India. It was held in Uttar Pradesh. Punjab defeated Maharashtra 3–0 in the final to win the competition for their fourth time.

== Preliminary Round Robin ==
=== Cluster A ===
Pos	Team	Pld	W	D	L	GF	GA	GD	Pts	Qualification
1	Bengal	3	3	0	0	8	0	+8	6	Advance to Quarter-finals
2	Madhya Pradesh	3	1	1	1	6	7	−1	3	
3	Orissa	3	0	2	1	6	7	−1	2	
4	Assam	3	0	1	2	2	8	−6	1	

Source: Sportstar, RSSF India 1985
Rules for classification: 1) points; 2) goal difference; 3) goals scored;
9 March 1985

Bengal	1–0	Assam
Prasanta Banerjee

Varanasi
9 March 1985

Madhya Pradesh	2–0	Orissa
P. Mohammad Khan; Ruby David

Varanasi
10 March 1985

Bengal	4–0	Orissa
Debashish Roy; Pranab Bose; Subir Sarkar

Varanasi
10 March 1985

Assam	4–4	Madhya Pradesh
Sirajuddin Ahmed; Ananta Sargari		R. David; Pyare; Sambhu Roy; A D'Souza

Varanasi
11 March 1985

Bengal	3–0	Madhya Pradesh
Prasanta Banerjee; Pranab Bose; Subir Sarkar

Varanasi
11 March 1985

Assam	2–2	Orissa
S. Ahmed; Laskar		Manas; Dilip

Varanasi

=== Cluster B ===
Pos	Team	Pld	W	D	L	GF	GA	GD	Pts	Qualification
1	Punjab	2	2	0	0	6	2	+4	4	Advance to Quarter-finals
2	Railways	2	0	1	1	2	4	−2	1	
3	Bihar	2	0	1	1	2	4	−2	1	

Source: Sportstar, RSSSF India 1985
Rules for classification: 1) points; 2) goal difference; 3) goals scored;
9 March 1985

Punjab	3–1	Railways
Kashmira Singh		Kalyan Chunda

Allahabad
10 March 1985

Punjab	3–1	Bihar
Satish Kumar; Parminder Singh; Parminder jr.		T. Sengupta

Allahabad
11 March 1985

Bihar	1–1	Railways
Vijay Kumar		Aminuddin

Allahabad

=== Cluster C ===
Pos	Team	Pld	W	D	L	GF	GA	GD	Pts	Qualification
1	Himachal Pradesh	3	2	1	0	2	0	+2	5	Advance to Quarter-finals
2	Haryana	3	1	1	1	3	2	+1	3	
3	Tamil Nadu	3	0	3	0	1	1	0	3	
4	Uttar Pradesh	3	0	1	2	0	3	−3	1	

Source: Sportstar, RSSSF India 1985
Rules for classification: 1) points; 2) goal difference; 3) goals scored;
9 March 1985

Tamil Nadu	1–1	Haryana
Anand Kumar		Somesh Bagga

Kanpur
9 March 1985

Himachal Pradesh	1–0	Uttar Pradesh
Sunil Kumar

Kanpur
10 March 1985

Tamil Nadu	0–0	Uttar Pradesh

Kanpur
10 March 1985

Himachal Pradesh	1–0	Haryana
Mangat Sharma

Kanpur
11 March 1985

Himachal Pradesh	0–0	Tamil Nadu

Kanpur
11 March 1985

Haryana	2–0	Uttar Pradesh
Satish Kumar; Somesh Bagga

Kanpur

=== Cluster D ===
Pos	Team	Pld	W	D	L	GF	GA	GD	Pts	Qualification
1	Maharashtra	2	2	0	0	2	0	+2	4	Advance to Quarter-finals
2	Gujarat	2	1	0	1	2	2	0	2	
3	Sikkim	2	0	0	2	1	3	−2	0	

Source: Sportstar, RSSSF India 1985
Rules for classification: 1) points; 2) goal difference; 3) goals scored;
9 March 1985

Maharashtra	1–0	Sikkim
Thomas

Gorakhpur
10 March 1985

Maharashtra	1–0	Gujarat
Anthony D'Souza

Gorakhpur
11 March 1985

Gujarat	2–1	Sikkim
S. D'Souza		Solomon Lepcha

Gorakhpur

=== Cluster E ===
Pos	Team	Pld	W	D	L	GF	GA	GD	Pts	Qualification
1	Goa	2	2	0	0	6	0	+6	4	Advance to Quarter-finals
2	Jammu and Kashmir	2	1	0	1	5	4	+1	2	
3	Tripura	2	0	0	2	0	7	−7	0	

Source: Sportstar, RSSSF India 1985
Rules for classification: 1) points; 2) goal difference; 3) goals scored;
9 March 1985

Goa	2–0	Tripura
Lawrence Thomas; Ignatius Dias

Dehra Dun
10 March 1985

Goa	4–0	Jammu and Kashmir
Francis D'Souza; Andrew; Ignatius Dias; Ashok Fadke

Dehra Dun
11 March 1985

Jammu and Kashmir	5–0	Tripura
Mustaq; Khurshid; Hussain Ahmed; ?

Dehra Dun

=== Cluster F ===
Pos	Team	Pld	W	D	L	GF	GA	GD	Pts	Qualification
1	Andhra Pradesh	2	2	0	0	7	1	+6	4	Advance to Quarter-finals
2	Manipur	2	1	0	1	2	3	−1	2	
3	Nagaland	2	0	0	2	2	7	−5	0	

Source: Sportstar, RSSSF India 1985
Rules for classification: 1) points; 2) goal difference; 3) goals scored;
9 March 1985

Andhra Pradesh	2–0	Manipur
Sharafuddin

Agra
10 March 1985

Andhra Pradesh	5–1	Nagaland
Muzaffar Ali; Sharafuddin; Iftikhar Alam; Nasir Ali		Kihoto

Agra
11 March 1985

Manipur	2–1	Nagaland
Lal Lengan; Tamphayai		Akum

Agra

=== Cluster G ===
Pos	Team	Pld	W	D	L	GF	GA	GD	Pts	Qualification
1	Delhi	2	1	1	0	3	1	+2	3	Advance to Quarter-finals
2	Karnataka	2	1	1	0	2	1	+1	3	
3	Rajasthan	2	0	0	2	2	5	−3	0	

Source: Sportstar, RSSSF India 1985
Rules for classification: 1) points; 2) goal difference; 3) goals scored;
9 March 1985

Delhi	0–0	Karnataka

Bareilly
10 March 1985

Karnataka	2–1	Rajasthan
Dayalamurthy; Murlidharan		Mahavir Prasad

Bareilly
11 March 1985

Delhi	3–1	Rajasthan
T. Roy; A. Barua; Akrar Ahmed		Maghan Singh

Bareilly

=== Cluster H ===
Pos	Team	Pld	W	D	L	GF	GA	GD	Pts	Qualification
1	Services	2	1	1	0	9	0	+9	3	Advance to Quarter-finals
2	Kerala	2	1	1	0	5	0	+5	3	
3	Pondicherry	2	0	0	2	0	14	−14	0	

Source: Sportstar, RSSSF India 1985
Rules for classification: 1) points; 2) goal difference; 3) goals scored;
9 March 1985

Services	0–0	Kerala

Lucknow
10 March 1985

Kerala	5–0	Pondicherry
M.M. Paulose; A. Rasheed; Peter Wilson; Sharafali; Joshua

Lucknow
11 March 1985

Services	9–0	Pondicherry
John Brook; A.K. Thapa; C.B. Thapa; Lakshmanan; D.C. Dhar; T.S. Lotha

Lucknow

== Quarter Finals ==
=== Quarter Final Group A ===
Pos	Team	Pld	W	D	L	GF	GA	GD	Pts	Qualification
1	Maharashtra	3	3	0	0	6	0	+6	6	Advance to Semi-finals
2	Punjab	3	2	0	1	9	2	+7	4	Advance to Semi-finals
3	Bengal	3	1	0	2	7	3	+4	2	
4	Himachal Pradesh	3	0	0	3	0	17	−17	0	

Source: Sportstar, RSSSF India 1985
Rules for classification: 1) points; 2) goal difference; 3) goals scored;
14 March 1985

Punjab	2–1	Bengal
Kashmira Singh		Debashish Roy

Varanasi
14 March 1985

Maharashtra	4–0	Himachal Pradesh
Anthony d'Souza; Joseph D'Silva; Mohammad Omar; Madanlal

Varanasi
16 March 1985

Maharashtra	1–0	Punjab
Anthony D'Souza

Varanasi
16 March 1985

Bengal	6–0	Himachal Pradesh
Debashish Mishra; Manoranjan Bhattacharjee; Debashish Roy; Sunirmal Chakravorty

Varanasi
18 March 1985

Maharashtra	1–0	Bengal
Anthony D'Souza

Varanasi
18 March 1985

Punjab	7–0	Himachal Pradesh
Kashmira Singh; Darshan Singh Masih; Satish Kumar

Varanasi

=== Quarter Final Group B ===
Pos	Team	Pld	W	D	L	GF	GA	GD	Pts	Qualification
1	Services	3	1	2	0	4	2	+2	4	Advance to Semi-finals
2	Andhra Pradesh	3	1	2	0	1	0	+1	4	Advance to Semi-finals
3	Goa	3	1	1	1	3	3	0	3	
4	Delhi	3	0	1	2	1	4	−3	1	

Source: Sportstar, RSSSF
Rules for classification: 1) points; 2) goal difference; 3) goals scored;
14 March 1985

Goa	0–0	Andhra Pradesh

Kanpur
14 March 1985

Delhi	1–1	Services
Anadi Barua		D. C. Dhar

Kanpur
16 March 1985

Andhra Pradesh	1–0	Delhi
Vivekanandan

Kanpur
16 March 1985

Services	3–1	Goa
C. B. Thapa; John Brook; D. C. Dhar		Ashok Fadke

Kanpur
18 March 1985

Services	0–0	Andhra Pradesh

Kanpur
18 March 1985

Goa	2–0	Delhi
Francis D'Souza; Ignatius Dias

Kanpur

== Semi-finals ==
20 March 1985

Maharashtra	1–0	Andhra Pradesh
Anthony D'Souza

Varanasi

21 March 1985

Punjab	3–1	Services
Parminder Singh; Yadav (o.g.); Darshan Singh Masih		T. Lotha

Kanpur

== Final ==
23 March 1985

Punjab	3–0	Maharashtra
Parminder Singh; Darshan Singh Masih

Kanpur
Attendance: 5000
