= List of Mohun Bagan Super Giant captains =

Mohun Bagan Super Giant (commonly referred to as Mohun Bagan) is an Indian association football club based in Kolkata, West Bengal. Founded in 1889, it is one of the oldest football clubs in Asia. The club competes in the Indian Super League, the top tier of Indian football league system.

Till now the club has won the top-flight football league a record seven times — Indian Super League and I-League twice and National Football League thrice. They are one of the most successful Indian clubs in the history of the Federation Cup, having won the championship a record 14 times. The club had also won several other trophies, including the ISL playoffs (2 times), the Durand Cup (17 times), the IFA Shield (21 times), the Rover's Cup (14 times) and the Calcutta Football League (31 times).

== List of captains ==
As of 2025

The following is the list of first-choice captains of Mohun Bagan's main football team in each of the Indian football years/seasons:

Note: The list doesn't include players who had been a substitute captain for selective matches.

Bold means player has represented his nation at least once internationally at senior-level.

Season	Nationality	Name	Notes/References
1889	India	Manilal Sen	Member of one of the founding families–Sen family of Bagbazar–of the club, was the first and the longest serving captain of the team.
1890	India	Manilal Sen	Member of one of the founding families–Sen family of Bagbazar–of the club, was the first and the longest serving captain of the team.
1891	India	Manilal Sen	Member of one of the founding families–Sen family of Bagbazar–of the club, was the first and the longest serving captain of the team.
1892	India	Manilal Sen	Member of one of the founding families–Sen family of Bagbazar–of the club, was the first and the longest serving captain of the team.
1893	India	Manilal Sen	Member of one of the founding families–Sen family of Bagbazar–of the club, was the first and the longest serving captain of the team.
1894	India	Manilal Sen	Member of one of the founding families–Sen family of Bagbazar–of the club, was the first and the longest serving captain of the team.
1895	India	Manilal Sen	Member of one of the founding families–Sen family of Bagbazar–of the club, was the first and the longest serving captain of the team.
1896	India	Manilal Sen	Member of one of the founding families–Sen family of Bagbazar–of the club, was the first and the longest serving captain of the team.
1897	India	Manilal Sen	Member of one of the founding families–Sen family of Bagbazar–of the club, was the first and the longest serving captain of the team.
1898	India	Manilal Sen	Member of one of the founding families–Sen family of Bagbazar–of the club, was the first and the longest serving captain of the team.
1899	India	Manilal Sen	Member of one of the founding families–Sen family of Bagbazar–of the club, was the first and the longest serving captain of the team.
1900	India	Manilal Sen	Member of one of the founding families–Sen family of Bagbazar–of the club, was the first and the longest serving captain of the team.
1901	India	Monmohan Pandey	
1902	India	Monmohan Pandey	
1903	India	Monmohan Pandey	
1904	India	Monmohan Pandey	
1905	India	Ramdas Bhaduri	
1906	India	Ramdas Bhaduri	
1907	India	Ramdas Bhaduri	
1908	India	Ramdas Bhaduri	
1909	India	Ramdas Bhaduri	
1910	India	Ramdas Bhaduri	
1911	India	Shibdas Bhaduri	Was the captain of the Immortal XI that won the 1911 IFA Shield.
1912	India	Shibdas Bhaduri	Was the captain of the Immortal XI that won the 1911 IFA Shield.
1913	India	Sirishchandra 'Habul' Sarkar	
1914	India	Sirishchandra 'Habul' Sarkar	
1915	India	Sirishchandra 'Habul' Sarkar	
1916	India	Bijoydas Bhaduri	
1917	India	Bijoydas Bhaduri	
1918	India	Bijoydas Bhaduri	
1919	India	Prakash Ghosh	
1920	India	Prakash Ghosh	
1921	India	**Gostha Pal**	
1922	India	**Gostha Pal**	
1923	India	**Gostha Pal**	
1924	India	**Gostha Pal**	
1925	India	**Gostha Pal**	
1926	India	**Umapati Kumar**	
1927	India	**Umapati Kumar**	
1928	India	**Umapati Kumar**	
1929	India	**Umapati Kumar**	
1930	India	Sudhansu Bose	
1931	India	Dr. Manmatha Nath Dutta	
1932	India	Dr. Manmatha Nath Dutta	
1933	India	Dr. Manmatha Nath Dutta	
1934	India	Abdul Hamid	From Quetta, Baluchistan; was the first captain not from Bengal.
1935	India	Bhola Sarkar	
1936	India	Satu Chowdhary	
1937	India	Satu Chowdhary	
1938	India	Bimal Mukherjee	Was the captain of the first CFL Premier Division winning team in 1939.
1939	India	Bimal Mukherjee	Was the captain of the first CFL Premier Division winning team in 1939.
1940	India	Nanda Roy Choudhury	
1941	India	Nanda Roy Choudhury	
1942	India	Mona Guin	
1943	India	Anil Dey	
1944	India	Anil Dey	
1945	India	Anil Dey	
1946	India	Sarat Das	
1947	India	Sarat Das	
1948	India	**Talimeren Ao**	
1949	India	**Talimeren Ao**	
1950	India	**Sailen Manna**	
1951	India	**Sailen Manna**	
1952	India	**Sailen Manna**	
1953	India	**Sailen Manna**	
1954	India	**Sailen Manna**	
1955	India	**Md. Abdus Sattar**	
1956	India	**Md. Abdus Sattar**	
1957	India	Swaraj Chatterjee	
1958	India	**Samar 'Badru' Banerjee**	
1959	India	Sushil Guha	
1960	India	**Subimal 'Chuni' Goswami**	
1961	India	**Subimal 'Chuni' Goswami**	
1962	India	**Subimal 'Chuni' Goswami**	
1963	India	**Subimal 'Chuni' Goswami**	
1964	India	**Subimal 'Chuni' Goswami**	
1965	India	**Jarnail Singh**	Had become the only ever Indian to lead Asian All-Star team in 1966.
1966	India	**Jarnail Singh**	Had become the only ever Indian to lead Asian All-Star team in 1966.
1967	India	**Jarnail Singh**	Had become the only ever Indian to lead Asian All-Star team in 1966.
1968	India	**Isaiah Arumainayagam**	
1969	India	**Chandreswar Prasad**	
1970	India	**Chandreswar Prasad**	
1971	India	**Chandreswar Prasad**	
1972	India	**Bhabani Ray**	
1973	India	**Sukalyan Ghosh Dastidar**	
1974	India	**Syed Nayeemuddin**	
1975	India	Nirmal Goswami	
1976	India	**Prasanta Mitra**	
1977	India	**Subrata Bhattacharya**	
1978	India	**Prasun Banerjee**	Was the captain of the first club based national tournament–Federation Cup–winning team in 1978.
1979	India	Dilip Palit	
1980	India	**Compton Dutta**	
1981	India	**Pradip Chowdhury**	
1982	India	**Shyam Thapa**	
1983	India	**Gautam Sarkar**	Was the first former East Bengal captain to lead the team.
1984	India	Shyamal Bose	
1985	India	**Bidesh Bose**	
1986	India	**Krishnendu Roy**	
1987	India	**Babu Mani**	
1988	India	**Prasanta Banerjee**	
1989	India	**Sisir Ghosh**	
1990	India	**Satyajit Chatterjee**	
1991	India	**Sisir Ghosh**	
1992	India	Achintya Belei	
1993	India	**Amit Bhadra**	
1994	India	**Tanumoy Basu**	
1995	India	**Sisir Ghosh**	
1996	India	**Sisir Ghosh**	
1997	India	**Aloke Das**	
1998	India	Biswanath Mondal	Was the captain of the first national league–National Football League–winning team in 1997-98.
1999	India	**Hemanta Dora**	
2000	India	Lolendra Singh	
2001	India	**Debjit Ghosh**	
2002	India	Dulal Biswas	
2003	India	**Renedy Singh**	
2004	India	**Monitombi Singh**	
2005	India	**Mehtab Hossain**	
2006	Brazil	José Ramirez Barreto	Was the first foreign national captain of the team. (Note: Although, Nigerian Bernard Operanozie was the first foreigner to lead Mohun Bagan, in 1993, but he was not a first-choice captain and was handed down the captainship after Amit Bhadra missed few games due to injury.)
2007–08	India	**Bhaichung Bhutia**	
2008–09	India	**Bhaichung Bhutia**	
2008–09	India	Lalkamal Bhowmick	
2009–10	India	**Sangram Mukherjee**	
2010–11	India	Ishfaq Ahmed	
2011–12	Brazil	José Ramirez Barreto	
2012–13	Nigeria	Odafa Onyeka Okolie	
2013–14	Nigeria	Odafa Onyeka Okolie	
2014–15	India	Shilton Paul	Was the captain of the first professional national league–I-League–winning team in 2014-15.
2015–16	India	Shilton Paul	Was the captain of the first professional national league–I-League–winning team in 2014-15.
2016–17	Japan	Katsumi Yusa	
2017–18	India	Kingshuk Debnath	(Note: Kingshuk became the first-choice captain after Nordé left the club before the end of the season.)
2017–18	Haiti	**Sony Nordé**	
2018–19	Haiti	**Sony Nordé**	(Note: Nordé became the first-choice captain after he joined the club mid-season.)
2018–19	Nigeria	Eze Kingsley Obumneme	
2019–20	India	**Dhanachandra Singh**	
2020–21	India	**Pritam Kotal**	
2020–21	India	**Arindam Bhattacharya**	
2020–21	India	**Sandesh Jhingan**	
2020–21	Spain	Edu García	
2020–21	Fiji	**Roy Krishna**	
2021–22	Fiji	**Roy Krishna**	
2021–22	India	**Subhasish Bose**	(Note: Subhasish Bose did not start any match as the team captain.)
2021–22	India	**Pritam Kotal**	
2022–23	India	**Pritam Kotal**	
2022–23	Finland	**Joni Kauko**	(Note: Subhasish Bose, Joni Kauko and Florentin Pogba did not start any match as the team captain.)
2022–23	Guinea	**Florentin Pogba**	
2022–23	India	**Subhasish Bose**	
2023–24	India	**Subhasish Bose**	Was the captain of the first ISL winning team in 2023-24.
2024–25	India	**Subhasish Bose**	Was the captain of the first ISL winning team in 2023-24.
2025–26	India	**Subhasish Bose**	

=== By nationality ===
As of August 2024

Nationality	No. of players	First (Season)	Last (Season)
Asia
India	71	Manilal Sen (1889)	Subhasish Bose (2025–26)
Japan	1	Katsumi Yusa (2016–17)	Katsumi Yusa (2016–17)
Total	72		
Africa
Nigeria	2	Odafa Onyeka Okolie (2012–13)	Eze Kingsley Obumneme (2018–19)
Guinea	1	Florentin Pogba (2022–23)	Florentin Pogba (2022–23)
Total	3		
Europe
Spain	1	Edu García (2020–21)	Edu García (2020–21)
Finland	1	Joni Kauko (2022–23)	Joni Kauko (2022–23)
Total	2		
North America
Haiti	1	Sony Nordé (2017–18)	Sony Nordé (2018–19)
Total	1		
South America
Brazil	1	José Ramirez Barreto (2006)	José Ramirez Barreto (2011–12)
Total	1		
Oceania
Fiji	1	Roy Krishna (2020–21)	Roy Krishna (2021–22)
Total	1		
