= 1986–87 Santosh Trophy =

National Football Championship

Tournament details
- Country: India

Final positions
- Champions: Bengal (22nd title)
- Runners-up: Railways

The 1986–87 Santosh Trophy was the 43rd edition of the Santosh Trophy, the main State competition for football in India. It was held in Tamluk, and Rabindra Sarobar Stadium and Mohun Bagan Ground in Calcutta, West Bengal. Bengal defeated Railways 2–0 in the final to win the competition for the 22nd time.

== Quarter-final League ==
Bihar, Services, Railways and Haryana qualified from Cluster one to four. The eight teams that finished in the top two positions in each group in the quarter-final league in 1985–86 were seeded directly to the quarter-final.

=== Group One ===
Pos	Team	Pld	W	D	L	GF	GA	GD	Pts	Qualification
1	Bihar	2	1	1	0	2	1	+1	3	Advance to Semi-finals
2	Punjab	2	0	2	0	0	0	0	2	
3	Andhra Pradesh	2	0	1	1	1	2	−1	1	

Source: Indian Express
12 April 1987

Bihar	0–0	Punjab
	Report

Mohun Bagan Ground, Calcutta
16 April 1987

Bihar	2–1	Andhra Pradesh
Aich; Hazre 32'	Report	Nazir Ali 67'

Mohun Bagan Ground, Calcutta
18 April 1987

Andhra Pradesh	0–0	Punjab
	Report

Mohun Bagan Ground, Calcutta

=== Group Two ===
Pos	Team	Pld	W	D	L	GF	GA	GD	Pts	Qualification
1	Kerala	2	1	1	0	2	1	+1	3	Advance to Semi-finals
2	Karnataka	2	1	0	1	1	1	0	2	
3	Services	2	0	1	1	1	2	−1	1	

Source: Indian Express
11 April 1987

Kerala	1–1	Services
Ganesan	Report	Suresh Mukhia 42'

Mohun Bagan Ground, Calcutta
11 April 1987

Karnataka	1–0	Services
?	Report

Mohun Bagan Ground, Calcutta

Karnataka goal-keeper Basheer saved a penalty from Brooks in the 57th minute.

17 April 1987

Kerala	1–0	Karnataka
Ganesan	Report

Mohun Bagan Ground, Calcutta

=== Group Three ===
Pos	Team	Pld	W	D	L	GF	GA	GD	Pts	Qualification
1	Railways	2	1	1	0	2	1	+1	3	Advance to Semi-finals
2	Goa	2	0	2	0	1	1	0	2	
3	Tamil Nadu	2	0	1	1	0	1	−1	1	

Source: Indian Express
11 April 1987

Railways	1–1	Goa
Sanjib Dutt	Report	Anthony D'Souza 28'

Mohun Bagan Ground, Calcutta
13 April 1987

Railways	1–0	Tamil Nadu
Pronob Mondal 14'	Report

Mohun Bagan Ground, Calcutta
Referee: S. S. Sailan (Maharashtra)
16 April 1987

Goa	0–0	Tamil Nadu
	Report

Mohun Bagan Ground, Calcutta

=== Group Four ===
Pos	Team	Pld	W	D	L	GF	GA	GD	Pts	Qualification
1	Bengal	2	2	0	0	6	1	+5	4	Advance to Semi-finals
2	Maharashtra	2	1	0	1	8	4	+4	2	
3	Haryana	2	0	0	2	2	11	−9	0	

Source: Indian Express
10 April 1987

Bengal	3–1	Haryana
Prasanta Banerjee 15'; Babu Mani 52'; Sisir Ghosh 70'	Report	Sumesh Bagga 14'

Mohun Bagan Ground, Calcutta

Bengal captain Biswajit Bhattacharya was replaced by Sisir Ghosh in the 30th minute of the first half. He played no further part in the tournament.

12 April 1987

Maharashtra	8–1	Haryana
Mustaq Ali 5', 47'; Umer 15'; Jaswant Singh 16', ?', ?', 45'; ?	Report	Sumesh Bagga ?' (pen.)

Mohun Bagan Ground, Calcutta

Maharashtra led 7–1 in the first half, four goals scored by Jaswant Singh.

14 April 1987

Bengal	3–0	Maharashtra
Sisir Ghosh 17'; Prasanta Banerjee 35'; Krishnendu Roy 87' (pen.)	Report

Mohun Bagan Ground, Calcutta
Referee: M . S. Krishnamurthy (Karnataka)

Prasanta Banerjee's goal went through the net and was awarded by the referee after consultation with the linesman B. S. Bisht. Maharashtra refused to play and there was a delay of seven minutes.

== Semifinal ==
20 April 1987

Bengal	1–1 (a.e.t.)	Kerala
Debashis Roy 70'	Report	Ganesan 35'
Penalties
Sudeep Chatterjee (penalty scored); Krishnendu Roy (penalty scored); Krishanu Dey (penalty scored); Sisir Ghosh (penalty scored)	4–2	(penalty scored) Thobias; (penalty scored) Harris Rehuman; (penalty missed) V. P. Sathyan; (penalty missed) Jayachandran

Mohun Bagan Ground, Calcutta
Attendance: 15000
Referee: Badal Chakrabarty (Tripura), S. S. Salian (Maharashtra), P.K. Basu (Bengal)

After the match ended at 1–1 after 90 minutes, the crowd threw stones at the Kerala players. Thomas Sebastian was hit by a stone and needed medical attention. Debashis Roy's header appeared to have been saved on the goal line but was given as a goal.

21 April 1987

Railways	2–0	Bihar
Uttam Ghosh ?' (pen.); Sanjeeb Dutta	Report

Mohun Bagan Ground, Calcutta
Referee: S. S. Salien (Maharashtra)

== Final ==
23 April 1987

Bengal	2–0	Railways
Amit Bhadra 64'; Sisir Ghosh 89'	Report

Mohun Bagan Ground, Calcutta
Attendance: 60,000
Referee: P.K. Basu (Madhya Pradesh)

Railways were coached by P. K. Banerjee. Bengal's coach was Arun Sinha and manager Subhash Bhowmick.

== Review ==
The tournament was widely criticised for the lack of quality. Jarnail Singh who gave away the prizes said that he had never seen such a poor nationals. "I didn't see a single team playing methodical and organised football .. I'm really pained to see such a fall in the standard of Indian football". Sailen Manna, a former captain of Indian football team, said it was one of the worst nationals that he had ever seen. It didn't help that Punjab and Goa, two of the strongest teams, could not make it to the semifinal.

The refeering was also of low quality. In the Bengal-Kerala semifinal, the referee Badal Chakrabarty and a linesman P.K. Basu were Bengalis. India had seven referees in the international panel. None of them were used in the tournament because of the possibility that they would be required for the pre-Olympic matches. Eventually, they stood in neither set of matches.
