= Parminder Singh (footballer) =

Indian footballer

Personal information
- Date of birth: 5 May 1957
- Place of birth: Kurali, Punjab, India
- Position: Midfielder

Senior career*
Years	Team	Apps	(Gls)
- JCT

International career
- India
- * Club domestic league appearances and goals

Parminder Singh was a former Indian association football player. He was part of the team that played at the 1984 AFC Asian Cup, and also played for JCT Mills in domestic leagues.

== Playing career ==
He represented the India national team from 1975 to 1986. He was declared as Best Player of the decade by AIFF in the year 1992. He represented "Asian All Star" Football Team in 1982. He also played two matches against Brazil for Asian All-star XI and played against Zico, Eder, Falcao, Socretes and others. He has set a record of playing 19 years for JCT and during his playing career he represented JCT in 19 Federation Cups, 19 Santosh Trophies. He joined JCT as Football Coach in the year 1995. He is a graduate and has done Diploma in Football Coaching From Sports Authority of India and has undergone AFC A License course,AFC B Licence Course, AFC C Licence Course, AFC C Licence Conditioning, AFC B Licence Conditioning Course FIFA Futuro-III Administration & Management Course.

== Honours ==
India

- South Asian Games Gold medal: 1985

Punjab

- Santosh Trophy: 1984–85

== See also ==
- List of India national football team captains
