= Ignatius Dias =

Indian football midfielder

Personal information
- Place of birth: India
- Position: Midfielder

Senior career*
Years	Team	Apps	(Gls)
- Salgaocar

International career
- India
- * Club domestic league appearances and goals

Ignatius Dias is an Indian former football midfielder who played for India in the 1984 Asian Cup. He also played for Goa and Salgaocar. He was part of the team that helped Goa win its first Santosh Trophy in 1984 scoring a brace to enable them enter the semifinals. He also was part of the Salgaocar team that retained the 1989 Federation Cup (India) scoring a goal in the semifinal of the tournament.
