= Paulo Zaltron =

Brazilian footballer

Personal information
- Full name: Paulo Roberto da Silva Zaltron
- Date of birth: July 6, 1980 (age 46)
- Place of birth: Cruz Alta, Rio Grande do Sul, Brazil
- Height: 1.85 m (6 ft 1 in)
- Position: Striker

Youth career
- Grêmio

Senior career*
| Years | Team | Apps | (Gls) |
| 2002–2003 | Bragantino | | |
| 2003–2004 | Londrina | | |
| 2004 | Guaratinguetá | | |
| 2004–2005 | Barbarense | 1 | (0) |
| 2005 | Ituano | 5 | (0) |
| 2005–2006 | Chapecoense | | |
| 2006–2007 | Sertãozinho | | |
| 2007 | Avaí | 2 | (1) |
| 2007–2011 | Mes Kerman | 97 | (19) |
| 2011–2012 | Kaveh Tehran | | |
- * Club domestic league appearances and goals as of 5 October 2010

Paulo Roberto da Silva Zaltron born July 6, 1980, in Cruz Alta, Rio Grande do Sul) is a Brazilian football striker.

== Club career ==
He moved to Mes in 2007 where the club was promoted to Persian Gulf Cup, and was a regular player for the team in his first season. In his second season he almost lost his spot after the entrance of his Brazilian teammates, but still scored number of goals.

=== Club career statistics ===
| Club performance | | | League | | Cup | | Continental | | Total | |
| Season | Club | League | Apps | Goals | Apps | Goals | Apps | Goals | Apps | Goals |
| Iran | | | League | | Hazfi Cup | | Asia | | Total | |
|---|---|---|---|---|---|---|---|---|---|---|
| 2007–08 | Mes | Persian Gulf Cup | 32 | 9 | 1 | 0 | - | - | 33 | 9 |
| 2008–09 | Mes | Persian Gulf Cup | 24 | 6 | 1 | 0 | - | - | 25 | 6 |
| 2009–10 | Mes | Persian Gulf Cup | 25 | 3 | 2 | 2 | 7 | 2 | 34 | 7 |
| 2010–11 | Mes | Persian Gulf Cup | 16 | 1 | 1 | 0 | - | - | 17 | 1 |
| Total | Iran | | 97 | 19 | 5 | 2 | 7 | 2 | 109 | 28 |
| Career total | | | 97 | 19 | 5 | 2 | 7 | 2 | 109 | 28 |

- Assist Goals

| Season | Team | Assists |
|---|---|---|
| 2008–09 | Mes | 2 |
| 2010–11 | Mes | 0 |
