= Giorgi Antadze =

Georgian and Soviet footballer and manager

Personal information
- Full name: Giorgi Samsonis dze Antadze
- Date of birth: 6 September 1920
- Place of birth: Poti, Georgia
- Date of death: 3 November 1987 (aged 67)
- Place of death: Tbilisi, Soviet Union
- Height: 1.69 m (5 ft 7 in)
- Position: Attacking midfielder

Senior career*
Years	Team	Apps	(Gls)
1939	TSU		
1942–1943	FC Dinamo Sokhumi		
1944–1954	FC Dinamo Tbilisi	176	(40)

International career
1952	Soviet Union XI	3	(0)

Managerial career
- 1959: FC Torpedo Kutaisi
- 1959–1961: FC Meshakhte Tkibuli
- 1962–1963: FC Kolkheti-1913 Poti
- 1964–1966: FC Meshakhte Tkibuli
- 1973–1974: FC Iveria Khashuri
- 1976–1978: FC Dinamo Batumi
- * Club domestic league appearances and goals

Giorgi Samsonis dze Antadze (Georgian: გიორგი სამსონის ძე ანთაძე, Russian: Георгий Самсонович Антадзе; born 6 September 1920 in Poti; died 3 November 1987 in Tbilisi), was a Georgian and Soviet football player and manager.

== Career ==
Antadze was capped three times for an unofficial Soviet Union representative team. He first appeared under manager Boris Arkadyev, on 14 May 1952, in a friendly unofficial international match, when the Soviet Union beat Poland 2–1. He played his second game on 24 May 1952 in their 1–1 draw with famous Hungarian national team led by legendary Ferenc Puskás, also in a friendly unofficial international match. Both matches were held at the Central Dynamo Stadium in Moscow.

== Honours ==
- Soviet Top League runner-up: 1951, 1953
- Soviet Cup runner-up: 1946
