= Krishnendu Roy =

Indian footballer

Personal information
- Place of birth: India
- Position: Defender

Senior career*
Years	Team	Apps	(Gls)
- Mohun Bagan

International career
1981–86	India		
- * Club domestic league appearances and goals

Krishnendu Roy is an Indian football defender who represented India in the 1984 Asian Cup. He also played for Mohun Bagan.

== Honours ==
India

- South Asian Games Gold medal: 1985

Bengal

- Santosh Trophy: 1986–87

He scored the only goal for India against Indonesia in Merdeka Cup in 1981, which took India to the semi-finals
