= Debashish Roy (footballer) =

Indian footballer (born 1955)

Personal information
- Full name: Debashish Roy
- Date of birth: 2 December 1954 (age 71)
- Place of birth: Karimganj, Assam, India
- Position: Centre-forward

Senior career*
Years	Team	Apps	(Gls)
?	Gauhati Town Club	?	(?)
?	Navajyoti Club	?	(?)
1979	Aryan	?	(?)
?	Mohun Bagan	?	(?)
1983-85	East Bengal	?	(65)
?	Mohammedan	?	(?)

International career
?	India		
- * Club domestic league appearances and goals

Debashish Roy (born 12 April 1955) is a former Indian footballer. This dynamic centre forward was the only footballer from Assam who played in all three giants of Kolkata Mohun Bagan AC, East Bengal Club and Mohammedan SC.

== Playing career ==
=== Early career ===
Born in Karimganj, Assam Roy started his football career by representing inter-college football tournaments for Karimganj College. Then he went onto captain the Gauhati University team in the All India University football championship and they defeated Calcutta University by 5-0 in the finals. He represented Assam football team twice and five times for Bengal in Santosh Trophy.

=== Club career ===
Roy played for two top clubs of Assam - Gauhati Town Club and Navajyoti Club. In 1979, he went to Kolkata to play professional league there. Initially he played for the Aryan FC before moving to bigger clubs like Mohun Bagan AC, East Bengal Club and Mohammedan SC. He was the top goal scorer in Calcutta Football League for East Bengal and Mohun Bagan in 1984 and 1986. Roy got an opportunity to play for a Hong Kong based club but unfortunately due to an injury he turned down the offer.

=== International career ===
Roy represented the senior India national football team for many occasions. He was also the vice captain of the junior India team.

== Honours ==
Bengal

- Santosh Trophy: 1986–87
