= Sisir Ghosh =

Indian footballer

Personal information
- Place of birth: Rishra, West Bengal, India
- Position: Striker

Senior career*
Years	Team	Apps	(Gls)
1984–1985	Aryan		
1985–1993	Mohun Bagan		(78)
1993–1995	East Bengal		(45)
1995–1997	Mohun Bagan		

International career
- India
Medal record
Men's football
Representing India
South Asian Games
Gold medal – first place	1987 Kolkata	Team competition
- * Club domestic league appearances and goals

Sisir Ghosh is a former Indian professional footballer who played as a striker for local Kolkata clubs Mohun Bagan and East Bengal. He also represented the India national team.

== International career ==
Ghosh made his competitive debut for the India national team on 21 March 1985 in a 1986 FIFA World Cup qualifier against Indonesia. He started as India were defeated 2–1.

== Honours ==
India

- South Asian Games Gold medal: 1985, 1987

Bengal

- Santosh Trophy: 1986–87
