= Prasanta Banerjee =

Indian football midfielder

Personal information
- Date of birth: 12 February 1958 (age 68)
- Place of birth: Calcutta, West Bengal, India
- Position: Midfielder

Senior career*
Years	Team	Apps	(Gls)
- Kalighat
- East Bengal
- Mohammedan Sporting
- Mohun Bagan

International career
- India
- * Club domestic league appearances and goals

Prasanta Banerjee is an Indian football midfielder who played for India national football team in the 1984 Asian Cup. He is one of the few players who has captained and won trophies in all three big clubs viz. East Bengal, Mohun Bagan, and Mohammedan Sporting.

== Playing career ==
He started his career at Kalighat in 1975. He joined East Bengal in 1976, and captained the team in 1979–80. Later he joined Mohammedan Sporting followed by Mohun Bagan. He has also captained Bengal in Santosh Trophy and India. He was Player of the Year in 1983. He also played for Mohun Bagan where he managed the club in the I-League.

== Managerial career ==
After retirement, Banerjee completed his AFC A, B, and C licensing courses. He later completed FIFA instructor course and worked as assistant coach of India U-17 team at the 2002–03 AFC U-17 Championship. Banerjee also managed West Bengal in Santosh Trophy, Port Trust and Aryan FC in the Calcutta Football League.

== Honours ==
India

- South Asian Games Gold medal: 1985
- Afghanistan Republic Day Cup third place: 1977

Bengal

- Santosh Trophy: 1981–82, 1986–87

East Bengal

- Federation Cup: 1978–79

== See also ==
- List of India national football team captains
