= Rothy's =

Shoe company

- Company type: Limited Company
- Industry: Retail
- Founded: San Francisco, California, U.S. (2012)
- Founder: Roth Martin; Stephen Hawthornthwaite
- Headquarters: San Francisco, California, U.S.
- Number of locations: 34
- Area served: Worldwide (shipping to 30+ countries)
- Key people: Jenny Ming (CEO)
- Products: Footwear, Handbags
- Number of employees: 1000
- Website: rothys.com

Rothy's is an American direct-to-consumer company which designs and sells shoes and accessories. Rothy's was initially founded in 2012 and launched in 2016 by Stephen Hawthornthwaite and Roth Martin as a women's shoe company in San Francisco. It has since expanded with handbags and a men's line.

Rothy's uses thread made from plastic bottles to knit its items, and 3D knits its shoes and handbags to shape, cutting waste. In March 2021, Rothy's launched a shoe recycling program, achieving LEED certification at its factory and reaching carbon neutrality. As of 2024, over 179 million bottles have been repurposed to make their products. Additionally, Rothy's has recycled over 20,000 pairs of shoes.

In December 2021, Rothy's was valued at $1 billion when Alpargatas, the Brazilian owner of Havaianas, took a 49.9% stake in the company.

== History ==
The company began in 2012 with Stephen Hawthornthwaite, an investment banker, and Roth Martin, a creative and gallerist. Their goal was to create a stylish and comfortable women's flat shoe from single-use plastic, reducing the excess that occurs with a traditional shoemaking process. There was a significant delay between the founding of the company and the launch due to the complexity of making the product. Their idea of making shoes from sustainable materials was inspired by companies like Patagonia.

Rothy's launched in September 2016, offering its first two styles directly from its website. In January 2017, Rothy's opened its own factory in Guangzhou, China, which today spans 300,000 square feet (28,000 m^{2}). By 2018, the brand had sold a million pairs, generating $140 million in revenue. In 2019, it surpassed 1.4 million customers, a 105% increase from the previous year. In March 2020, the brand began selling handbags made with plastic and expanded to a men's category in 2021. The company has entered the children's market, launching a children's version of its loafer silhouette and slip-on sneakers. featuring both solids and unisex prints.

Rothy's investors include Goldman Sachs and Lightspeed Venture Partners, who have invested $35 million and $5 million respectively, and $2 million in convertible notes from Finn Capital Partners, M13 and Grace Beauty Capital. In December 2021, Alpargatas, the Brazilian owner of Havaianas, invested $200 million in cash, followed by a purchase of $275 million of shares, acquiring a 49.9% stake in the company and resulting in a valuation of $1 billion.

As of September 2022, the company had resolved litigation against Birdies, Steve Madden, OESH Shoes and Giesswein. In January 2024, Jenny Ming, former cofounder and President of Old Navy, was appointed CEO, helming Rothy's all female leadership team.

== Production ==
Rothy's products are made from recycled plastic water bottles and post-consumer recycled materials. During the manufacturing process, the water bottles are hot washed and sterilized. Chips of plastic are melted down into pellets, stretched into fibers, and given air treatment until they entwine. The uppers are knit and then sewn to the sole by hand, paired with recycled foam and rubber soles.

== Retail ==
As of January 2024, Rothy's operates 20 stores with a footprint in 19 countries and has stores in cities such as San Francisco, Washington, D.C., Boston, New York City, Los Angeles, Atlanta, Chicago, Walnut Creek, San Diego, Scottsdale, Austin, Seattle, and Minneapolis. In May 2024, Rothy's launched on Amazon Fashion store.

== Reception ==
Some critics have praised the shoes for their sustainability, aesthetic, and comfort. Kavita Varma-White of Today described Rothy's as the "perfect travel shoe". According to Business of Fashion, Rothy's range caters to women looking for an alternative to sneakers or ballet shoes. Celebrity fans include Katie Holmes, Reese Witherspoon, Kerry Washington, and Meghan Markle.

Time magazine named Rothy's one of the Most Influential Companies of 2021. The company's men's driving loafer has been recognized as a Time 2021 Best Invention, and its RS01 sneaker was named Men's Health Most Innovative Shoe. Rothy's was included in Fast Company's list of "The 10 most innovative style companies of 2020". Rothy's has also been recognized as a Best Place to Work by Inc. magazine.
