= Hickies (shoes) =

HICKIES
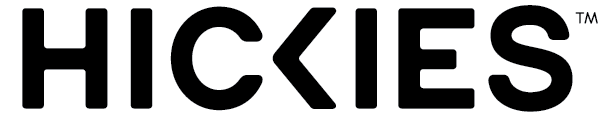
- Company type: Private held company
- Founded: 2011
- Founder: Gaston Frydlewski and Mariquel Waingarten
- Headquarters: New York, New York, United States
- Area served: North America, South America, Asia, Europe, Australia
- Products: Hickies Lacing System
- Brands: Hickies
- Owner: Gaston Frydlewski and Mariquel Waingarten
- Website: https://www.hickies.com

HICKIES, Inc is a footwear accessories company headquartered in Brooklyn, New York, producing a no-tie shoelace alternative which is currently sold in over 40 countries. The company was founded in 2011 by Gaston Frydlweski and Mariquel Waingarten. Frydlewski is CEO and Waingarten as chief marketing officer. The name HICKIES is from the cheeky term for a mark of affection. The founders believe the world needs more “marks of affection”, and they wanted to leave a mark of affection on everyone's footwear.

== History ==
Hickies launched its first product with a Kick starter campaign in 2012 that raised US$159,167, six times more than the $25,000 goal. Following the Kick starter campaign, the company opened office in Brooklyn, New York and began production in Taiwan. After initial funding, Hydra Ventures, along with other investment funds, then invested US$6.2 million in the company.

In October 2012, Brookstone introduced the product to the footwear market.

In 2015, Argentine apparel manufacturer and distributor Topper (sports) signed an agreement with Hickies. In Argentina and other South American countries, Topper (sports) handles the distribution and sales of Hickies Lacing System.

== Products ==
HICKIES designs, produces and markets a product called the Hickies Lacing System. The lacing system replaces traditional shoelaces in footwear. The lacing system also helps people with impaired fine motor skills, such as cerebral palsy and autism wear shoes that require lacing.

Hickies laces are made from a plastic Elastomer and the head is fashioned from a Polycarbonate. Individual strap and head combinations are inserted into the shoe's eyelets in a number of pre-established lacing patterns in order to adjust the fit to the user.

== Endorsements ==
Hickies products have been featured or worn by pro-golfer Danny Willett, Whoopi Goldberg, Chloë Grace Moretz, designer Diane von Fürstenberg. In May 2016, HICKIES signed golfer Danny Willett on a two-year endorsement deal that will include creation of a Danny Willett signature golf HICKIES Lacing System.
