= Rainha =

Brazilian sports equipment brand

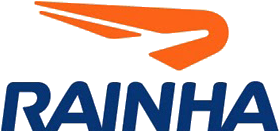
- Industry: Apparel; Sports equipment
- Founded: 1934; 92 years ago
- Headquarters: São Paulo, Brazil
- Products: Athletic shoes; athletic apparel; sporting goods; accessories
- Parent: Saad & Cia. (1934–1978); Alpargatas Argentina (1978–2013); Alpargatas S.A. (2013–2018); BR Sports (2018–present)
- Website: www.rainha.com.br

Rainha is a Brazilian sports equipment brand, currently owned by BR Sports, a holding based in São Paulo.

Products under the 'Rainha' brand include sneakers and clothing. 'Rainha' in Portuguese means 'queen'.

== History ==
It began in 1934 when the Saad & Cia company, using a new process in the Brazilian manufacturing market with sterilization technology, launched sports shoes on the market. In the following decades the brand, widely recognized by a "torch" in its logo. In 1978, Alpargatas S.A. purchases the brand.

In the early 1980s the brand gained scale and distribution with its iconic Mont Car, Iate, Bullit and VL2500 models. Rainha left to be just an elite item, becoming a high-volume brand, choosing sports as its platform. It was the first sports brand to sign a sponsorship contract with professional club Super League team Pirelli Santo André. In 1983, Rainha became sponsor of The Great Volleyball Challenge, a friendly match between Brazil vs. USSR held in Maracanã Stadium.

In 2015 the brand was acquired by "BR Sports", a holding company part of the Sforza Group, whose president was entrepreneur Carlos Wizard Martins.

== Past sponsorships ==
Rainha was the official kit provider of several professional sports teams. The list includes:

=== Football ===
==== National Teams ====
- Paraguay (1984–86)

==== Clubs teams ====
- (Brazil) Londrina
- (Brazil) Atlético Mineiro (1981–82)
- (Brazil) Náutico
- (Brazil) Taubaté
- (Brazil) S. E. Matsubara

=== Volleyball ===
==== National Teams ====
- Brazil

==== Clubs teams ====
- (Brazil) Minas
- (Brazil) Pirelli Santo André
