= Sociedade Esportiva Matsubara =

Matsubara
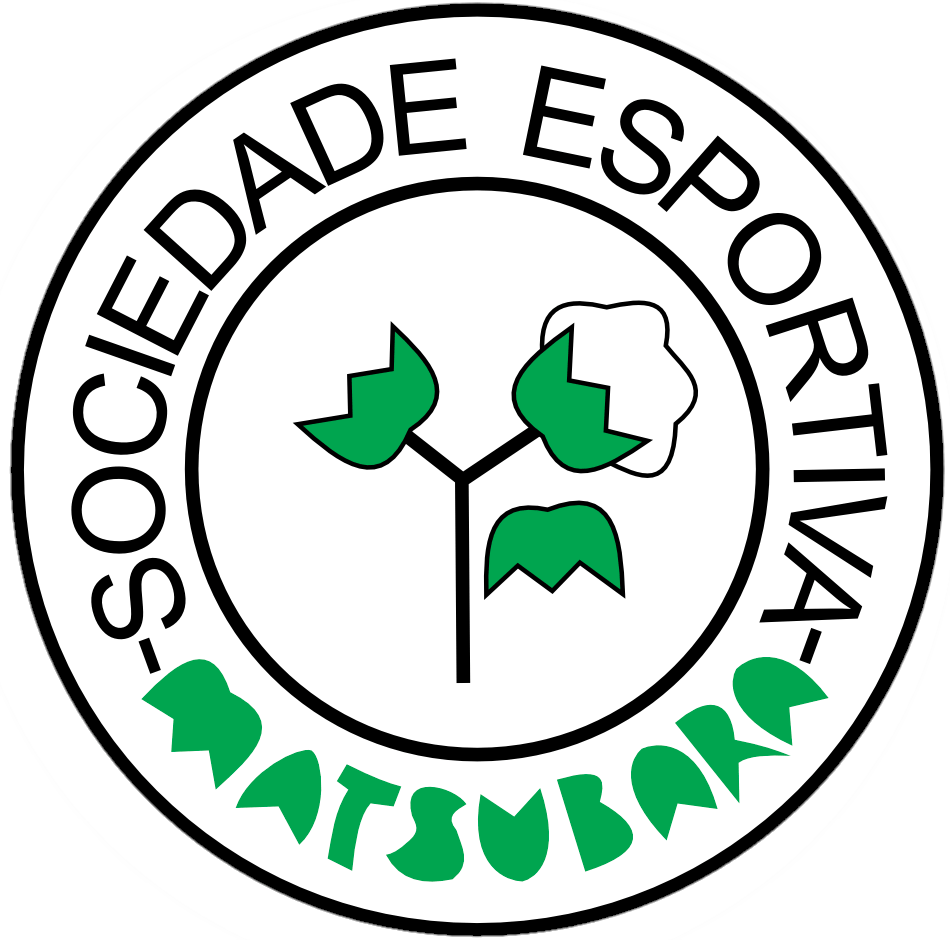
- Full name: Sociedade Esportiva Matsubara
- Nickname: Japonesinho
- Founded: December 18, 1974; 51 years ago
- Ground: Regional de Cambará; Café
- Capacity: 15,000 (Regional de Cambará); 45,000 (Café)
- Chairman: Sueo Matsubara
- Website: www.matsubara.co
Home colours	Away colours

Sociedade Esportiva Matsubara (S. E. Matsubara), usually known simply as Matsubara, is a Brazilian football club based in Cambará, in the state of Paraná.

== History ==
It was founded on December 18, 1974 by the Japanese Brazilian Sueo Matsubara to replace the local club Cambaraense, runner-up of the 1953 Paranaense championship.

In 1976, Matsubara was Campeonato Paranaense runner-up.

In 1992, Matsubara finished in Campeonato Brasileiro Série C's third position. The club was eliminated in the Group B final (which is the stage immediately before the competition final) by Fluminense de Feira.

In 1995, the club transferred to Londrina, returning to Cambará soon after.

== Honours ==
=== State ===
- Campeonato Paranaense Série Prata
  - Runners-up (1): 1976
- Torneio Integração de Futebol Profissional
  - Winners (1): 1989

=== Youth ===
- Copa Santiago de Futebol Juvenil
  - Winners (1): 1991

=== Friendly tournaments ===
- BTV Cup
  - Winners (2): 2007, 2011

== Stadiums ==
Matsubara plays its home matches at Regional de Cambará, which has a maximum capacity of 15,000 people, and is owned by the Torcida Organizada Matsubara, which are an ultra group supporting the club.

The club also plays at Café Stadium, which has a maximum capacity of approximately 45,000 people and is located in Londrina city.

Matsubara owns a training ground called Vila Olímpica (Olympic Village).

== Kit suppliers and shirt sponsors ==
Period	Kit manufacturer	Shirt sponsor (chest)	Shirt sponsor (sleeve)
1974–1975	None	None	None
1976–1979	Rainha	Consul	None
1980–1984	Rainha	Cofap	None
1985–1989	Asics	Suntory	None
1990–1994	Asics	Banco do Brasil	None
1995–1999	Penalty	Sony	Band
2000–2004	Penalty	Honda	Guaraná Antarctica
2005–2009	Penalty	Yamaha	Guaraná Antarctica
2010–2014	Mizuno	Vivo	Votorantim
2015–2019	Mizuno	Nissan	Magazine Luiza
2020–2024	Mizuno	Crunchyroll	Dentsu
2025–2029	Mizuno	Bushiroad	Meiji Holdings

== Youth squad ==
The club has worked hard to train its younger members, and has produced many professional athletes. Players produced by the club are usually negotiated with Brazilian clubs, and clubs from other countries, like China, Germany, Italy, Japan, Morocco, Portugal, Hong Kong, Switzerland, Australia, Thailand, Philippines, Uruguay, Indonesia, and Vietnam.

== Mascot ==
The club's mascot is called Japonesinho, which is the Portuguese for Little Japanese.
