= BTV Cup =

International friendly football tournament in Vietnam

The BTV Cup (also Bình Dương Television Cup) is an international friendly cup held annually at Gò Đậu Stadium, home stadium of Vietnamese football club Becamex Bình Dương. Participating teams are mostly football clubs but there were some national youth sides in the past.

== Champions ==
Seasons	Finals			3rd place match
Seasons	Champions	Score	Runner-up	Third Place	Score	Fourth Place
2000	(Vietnam) Cang Sai Gon	?	(Vietnam) Ho Chi Minh City Police	?	?	?
2001	(Vietnam) Ho Chi Minh City Police	3-2	(Vietnam) Cang Sai Gon		?	?
2002	(Vietnam) Bình Dương	2-0	(Vietnam) Dong A Bank	(Vietnam) Đồng Tâm Long An	?	(Vietnam) Cang Sai Gon
2003	(Vietnam) Bình Dương	1-0	(Vietnam) Đồng Tâm Long An	(Thailand) Krung Thai Bank F.C.	2-0	(Vietnam) Dong A Bank
2004	(Vietnam) Đồng Tâm Long An	3-1	(South Korea) Suwon City FC	(Vietnam) Bình Dương	Not played	(Brazil) Matsubara
2005	(Vietnam) Bình Dương	1-0	(Vietnam) Đồng Tâm Long An	(Singapore) Tampines Rovers	3-1	(Vietnam) SHB Đà Nẵng
2006	(South Korea) Busan Kyotong	3-2	(Vietnam) Bình Dương	(Vietnam) Bình Định F.C.	3-1	(Vietnam) Đồng Tâm Long An
2007	(Brazil) Matsubara	1-1 (pen. 4–3)	(Vietnam) Đồng Tâm Long An	(South Korea) Daejeon Citizen F.C.	3-1	(Vietnam) SHB Đà Nẵng
2008	(Vietnam) SHB Đà Nẵng	3-3 a.e.t (pen. 4–2)	(Vietnam) Bình Dương	(Brazil) Matsubara	7-2	(South Korea) Korea University FC
2009	(Brazil) Duque de Caxias	2-1	(Vietnam) Đồng Tâm Long An	(Vietnam) Xi Mang Hai Phong	3-1	(Vietnam) Bình Dương
2010	(Vietnam) Đồng Tâm Long An	1-0 a.e.t	(Brazil) Matsubara	(Vietnam) Bình Dương	2-1	(Vietnam) Vicem Hai Phong
2011	(Brazil) Matsubara	2-0	(Vietnam) Bình Dương	(Vietnam) Saigon Xuan Thanh	1-0	(Uganda) SC Villa
2012	(Vietnam) Bình Dương	2-0	U22 Vietnam	(Brazil) Grêmio Barueri Futebol	4-0	(Vietnam) Saigon Xuan Thanh
2013	(Vietnam) Bình Dương	1-0	U23 Vietnam	(Brazil) Bangu Atlético Clube	6-1	(South Korea) Korea University
2014	(South Korea) Korea University	2-1	(Vietnam) Đồng Tâm Long An	(Brazil) Sport Clube Capixaba	2-1	(Vietnam) SHB Đà Nẵng
2015	(Brazil) Bangu	3-2	(South Korea) Korea University	(Vietnam) Đồng Tâm Long An	3-0	Japan University
2016	(Japan) Shonan Bellmare	2-1	(Vietnam) SHB Đà Nẵng	(South Korea) Korea University	3-0	(Cambodia) Boeung Ket Angkor FC
2017	(Vietnam) Becamex Bình Dương	1-0	(Brazil) CR Vasco da Gama B	(Vietnam) Quảng Nam	1-1 (pen. 4–2)	(Vietnam) Hoàng Anh Gia Lai

== Participating teams ==
- (Vietnam) Bình Dương (host)
- (Vietnam) Đồng Tâm Long An 2000–2010, 2013, 2014, 2015
- (Vietnam) Sông Lam Nghệ An 2003
- (Vietnam) Ho Chi Minh City Police 2000, 2001
- (Vietnam) Dong A Bank 2002, 2003
- (Vietnam) Hai Quan F.C. 2001
- (Vietnam) Hải Phòng F.C. 2003, 2008, 2011
- (Vietnam) Da Nang F.C. 2005–2009, 2011, 2012, 2014
- (Vietnam) Cang Sai Gon 2000–2002, 2005
- (Vietnam) Đồng Tháp F.C. 2002, 2004
- (Vietnam) Tiền Giang F.C. 2002
- (Vietnam) Cần Thơ F.C. 2002
- (Vietnam) Bình Định F.C. 2001, 2002, 2006
- (Vietnam) Hoang Anh Gia Lai 2000, 2007
- (Vietnam) Khatoco Khánh Hòa F.C. 2001, 2010
- (Vietnam) Saigon Xuan Thanh F.C. 2011, 2012
- U22 Vietnam 2012, 2013
- (Vietnam) Đồng Nai F.C. 2013
- (Vietnam) Than Quảng Ninh F.C. 2014
- (Brazil) Matsubara 2004, 2006–2008, 2010, 2011
- (Brazil) Duque de Caxias 2009
- (Brazil) Grêmio Barueri 2012
- (Brazil) Bangu 2013, 2015, 2016
- (Brazil) Sport Clube Capixaba 2014
- Cambodia Olympic 2003
- (Cambodia) Boeung Ket Angkor FC 2016
- (China) Xiamen Lanshi 2005
- (China) Wuhan 2006
- (China) Dalian Shide 2007
- (China) Chongqing Lifan 2009
- (France) ÉFC Fréjus Saint-Raphaël 2010
- (Hungary) REAC Sportiskola 2013
- (India) East Bengal Club 2011
- Indonesia U20 2004
- (Indonesia) Semen Padang F.C. 2013
- (Japan) Avispa Fukuoka 2012
- Laos 2003
- (Laos) MCTPC 2004
- Malaysia U21 2004
- (Maldives) New Radiant SC 2008
- (Myanmar) Ayeyawady United F.C. 2014
- (Singapore) Tampines Rovers 2005
- (Singapore) Woodlands Wellington 2006
- (Slovakia) Artmedia 2009
- (Slovakia) MŠK Žilina 2011
- (South Korea) Suwon City FC 2004
- (South Korea) Ulsan Hyundai Mipo Dockyard 2005
- (South Korea) Busan Kyotong 2006
- (South Korea) Daejeon Citizen F.C. 2007
- (South Korea) Korea University Team 2008, 2013, 2014, 2015
- (Thailand) Krung Thai Bank F.C. 2003
- (Thailand) Osotsapa F.C. 2004
- (Thailand) PEA 2005
- (Thailand) Chonburi FC 2007, 2010, 2012
- (Thailand) BEC Tero Sasana F.C. 2014
- (Uganda) Kampala City 2009
- (Uganda) Express FC 2010
- (Uganda) SC Villa 2011
