= Alpargatas Argentina =

Textile manufacturer in Argentina

Alpargatas S.A.I.C.
- Type: Subsidiary
- Industry: Textile, footwear
- Founded: 1885; 141 years ago
- Headquarters: Barracas, Argentina
- Key people: Márcio Luiz Simões Utsch, President; Cristino Javier Goñi, COO
- Products: Sneakers, flip-flops, sportswear, casual wear
- Brands: Topper (1975–2007); Flecha; Pampero
- Revenue: ▲US$ 283 million (2011)
- Net income: ▲US$ 4 million (2011)
- Total assets: US$ 195 million (12/2011)
- Number of employees: 4,000
- Parent: Nea Tex S.A. (2018–present); Alpargatas S.A. (2007–18)
- Subsidiaries: Alpargatas S.A. (1907–82)

Alpargatas S.A.I.C. is an Argentine manufacturing company of clothing and footwear. Alpargatas was the leading textile and footwear manufacturer in the country, as well as a major local distributor and exporter. Originally established in 1885, since 2007 the company is a subsidiary of Brazilian Alpargatas S.A., formerly part of the industrial conglomerate Camargo Corrêa.

In 2018, the textile division of Alpargatas was acquired by an Argentine company, Nea Tex S.A., establishing "Alpargatas Textil" as an independent business. The company set its headquarters in Barracas, Buenos Aires.

== History ==
Juan Echegaray, a Basque Argentine immigrant, and the textile engineering background of Robert Fraser, a Scottish Argentine immigrant, created a partnership in 1883 for the manufacture of espadrilles (jute-soled canvas footwear favored by laborers for their comfort, durability and low cost). These shoes, called alpargatas in Spanish, inspired the company's name, Sociedad Anónima Fábrica Argentina de Alpargatas, upon its incorporation in 1885.

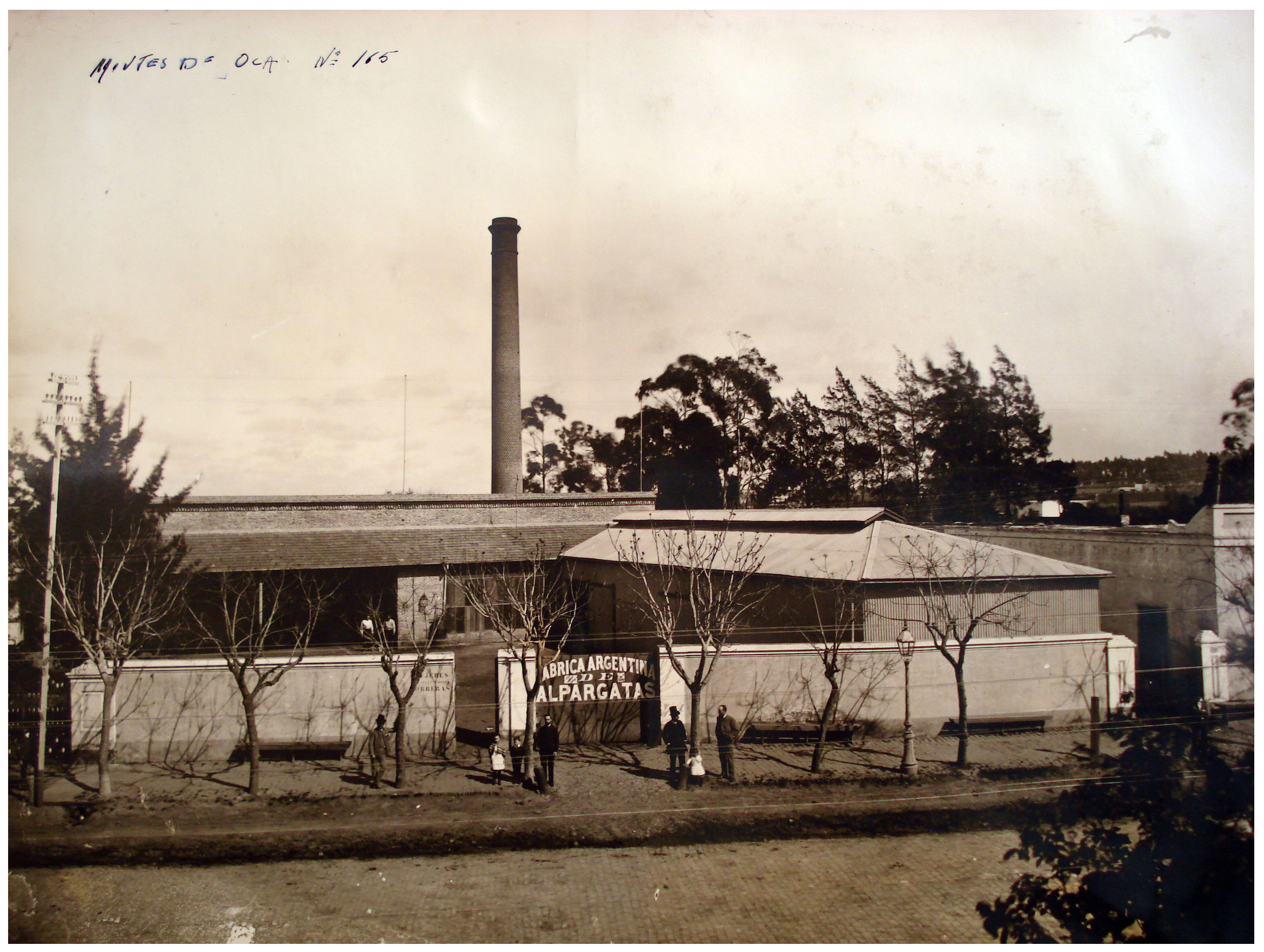
The Alpargatas factory in Barracas, Buenos Aires, 1920

Demand for the unassuming footwear grew with the wave of immigration in Argentina during the 1880s, and by 1890, Alpargatas had established a facility in neighboring Uruguay. The fast-growing textile industry led to its diversification into yarn in 1892, and by 1907, a facility was opened in São Paulo, Brazil under the name "Sao Paulo Alpargatas".

The company's growth allowed it to develop larger facilities in 1928 occupying a city block in Buenos Aires' southside Barracas section. This facility began making vulcanized rubber sole shoes in the 1930s under the supervision of engineer Luis Pastorino.

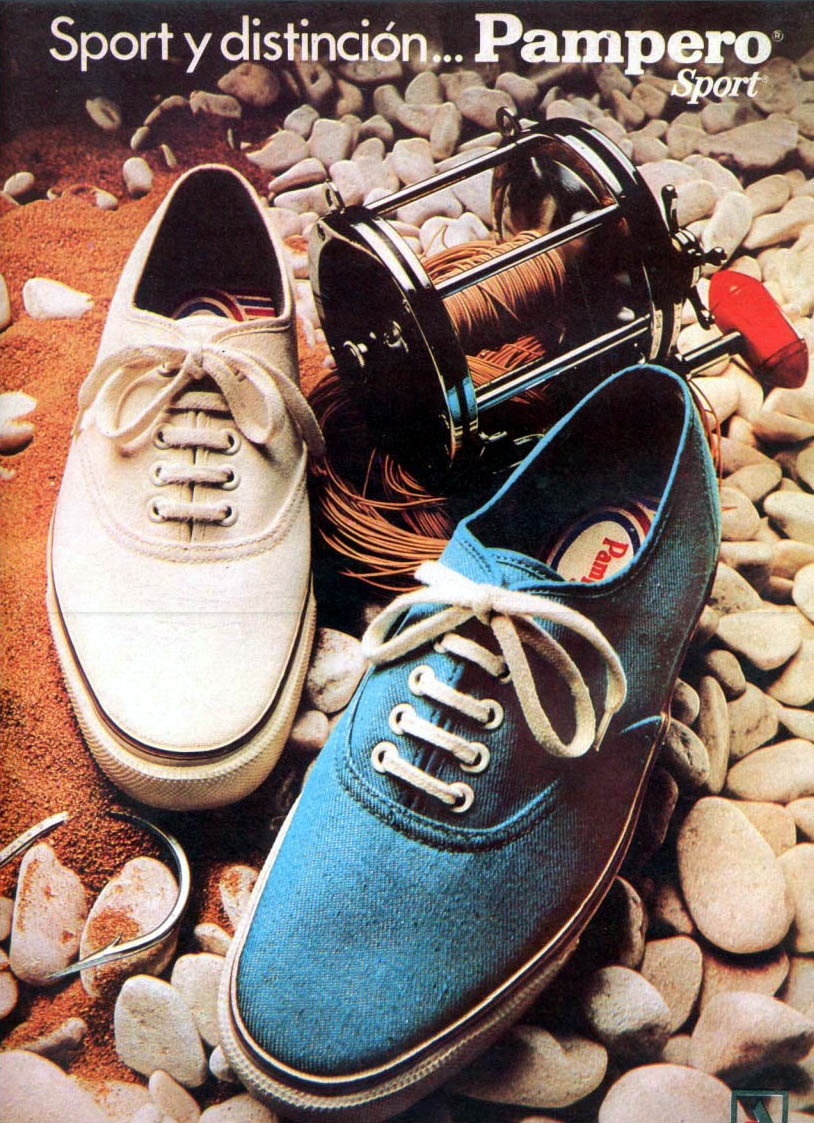
Pampero brand of sneakers by Alpargatas, 1971 ad

Alpargatas relocated its manufacturing facilities to the southern suburb of Florencio Varela in 1950. This new, 70,000 m² (740,000 ft²) facility allowed it to diversify its product line, leading to the launching of Flecha, its casual footwear brand, in 1962. The establishment of a cotton gin in Sáenz Peña, a town in northern Argentina, allowed Alpargatas to manufacture denim in 1968, allowing it to take advantage to fashion trends in that direction, and a new plant in Aguilares, Tucumán, allowed it to create its Pampero children's footwear line in 1972.

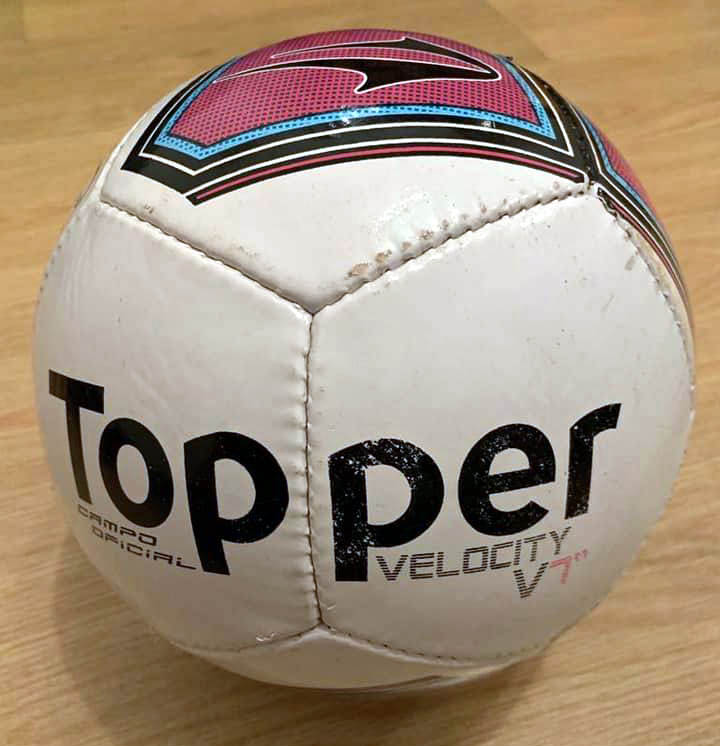
Football by Topper, a brand created and launched by Alpargatas in 1975

The company's 1975 launch of an athletic shoe line created what became perhaps its most durable brand name in Argentina: "Topper". A new plant in Catamarca led to another commercial success, the "Palette" home fabrics line. The group expanded into banking in 1978 with the acquisition of a 50% stake in the BBVA Banco Francés, a small financial institution which grew from 15 to 62 branches when the company sold its stake to local venture capitalist Eduardo Constantini in 1991.

The longtime CEO of Alpargatas, Eduardo Oxenford, was appointed to head federal receivership of the Argentine Industrial Union after the March 1976 coup. He was named Minister of Industry by the administration of General Roberto Viola in 1981, quitting however within months over policies that adversely affected industry.

Alpargatas began making PVC-soled footwear in 1983, and in 1987, it secured the country's sole license to manufacture Nike shoes. The growing incidence of imports in the local apparel and footwear market during the 1990s prompted the company to open its first factory outlet stores in 1995, and in 1998, it established Dialog, a logistics company, for its transport and warehousing needs.

The company's São Paulo facilities, Alpargatas S.A. were acquired by Camargo Correa Group in the 1980s, and in 2008, the Brazilian subsidiary bought a 35% stake in Alpargatas Argentina. This group had previously acquired Argentine companies Grafa and Loma Negra.

In 2010 the company sold its brand "Pampero" (workwear) to a commercial society formed by local company Cardón and the Karagozian family. In October 2012, Alpargatas sold the bedspread brand "Palette".

On March 19, 2013, Alpargatas S.A. acquired 4,33% of Alpargatas SAIC for US$ 4,7 million therefore the former Brazilian subsidiary controlled 100% of Alpargatas Argentina.

== Brands and products ==
Brand	Products
Alpargatas Textil	Denim clothes and fabrics
Flecha	Sneakers
Havaianas (Note: Brand and product created in 1962 by the Brazilian subsidiary in that country.)	Flip-flops
Media Naranja	Buckets, tea towels, squeegees
Pampero	Workwear, sneakers
Rueda	Espadrilles, (Note: English name for "alpargata".) sneakers
Topper	Sports equipment

== Social relevance ==
Alpargatas gained notoriety when in 1931 local artist Florencio Molina Campos started to illustrate company's calendars with his gaucho-life paintings. The artist was paid with A$ 6,000 for 12 original paintings. Molina Campos continued his collaboration with Alpargatas until 1936. Commercial relations between the artist and the company were renewed for a new production of calendars from 1940 to 1945. It is estimated that a total of about 18 million calendars were printed.
