= Florencio Molina Campos =

Argentine illustrator and painter

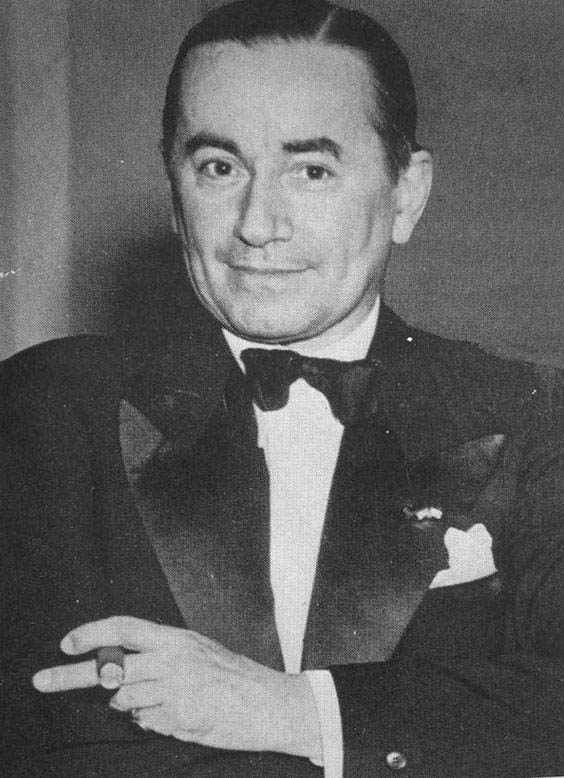
- Molina Campos in the 1930s
- Born: August 21, 1891; Buenos Aires, Argentina
- Died: November 16, 1959 (aged 68); Buenos Aires
- Notable work: Alpargatas calendar series
- Movement: Costumbrismo
- Website: molinacampos.net

Florencio Molina Campos (birth name, Florencio de los Ángeles Molina Campos, August 21, 1891 – November 16, 1959) was an Argentine illustrator and a painter known for his typical traditional scenes of the Pampa. His work represents gauchesco scenes with a bit of humor.

== Biography ==
Molina Campos was born in Buenos Aires. His first exhibition was at the Central Hall of the Sociedad Rural Argentina, in 1926. Marcelo Torcuato de Alvear, the President of Argentina at that time, named him art teacher of the "Colegio Nacional Avellaneda" after seeing the exhibition.

In 1930, the Alpargatas Argentina company, makers of espadrilles, under the supervision of engineer Luis Pastorino, commissioned 12 illustrations (using gouache technique) from him for their 1931 calendar. These were so successful that Molina Campos continued to provide the drawings for the next 12 years. In 1942 he exhibited at the Modern Art Museum of San Francisco, which following the exhibition toured the United States. In 1956 he had an exhibition at the Witcomb Gallery in Buenos Aires.

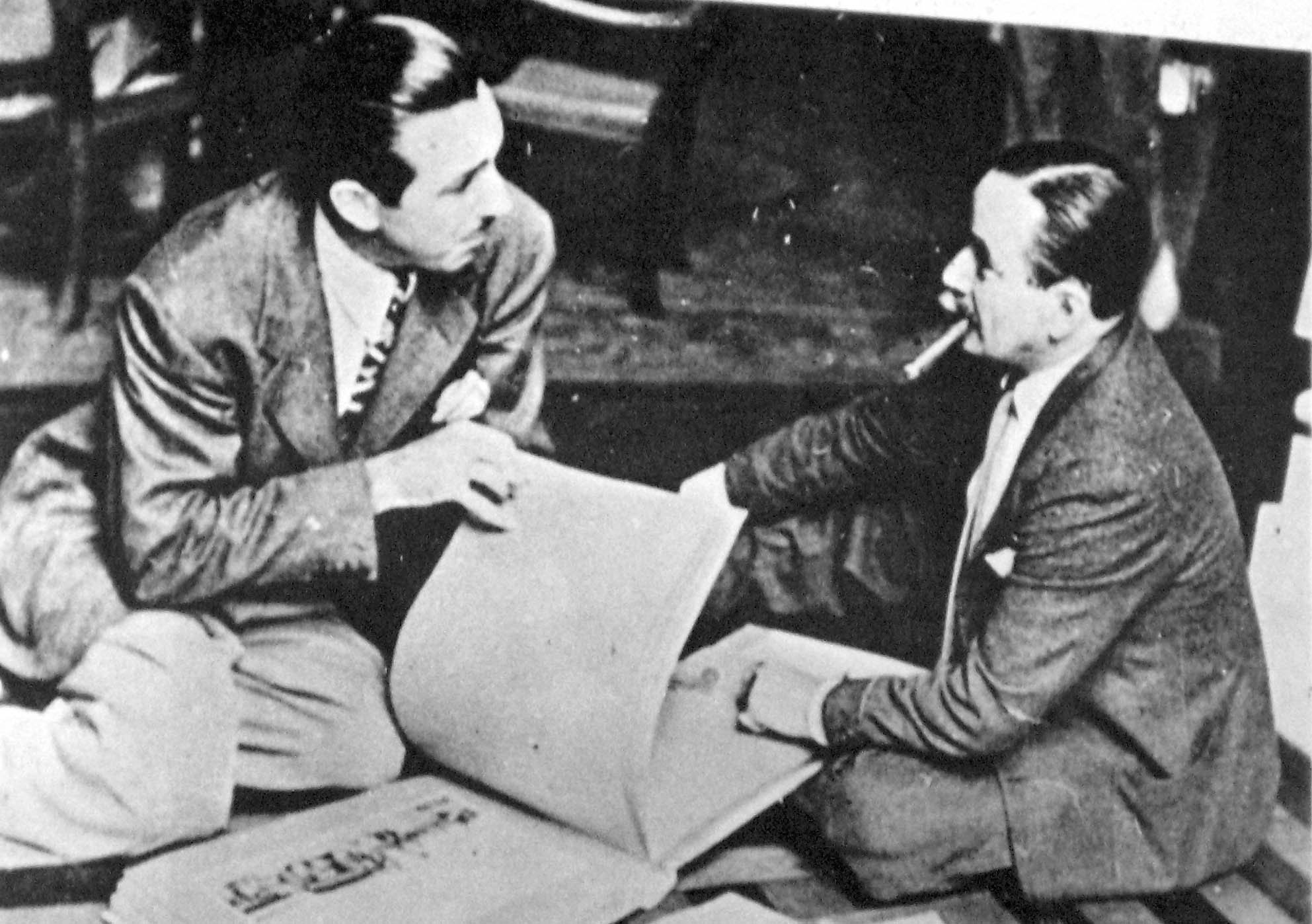
Molina Campos (right) with Walt Disney in 1941 when the American entrepreneur visited Argentina

In the late 1940s until the mid-1950s he was engaged as a creative artist consulting for the studio of his long-time friend Walt Disney. Together during their trips to Bariloche they worked on the creation of characters for the 1942 animated film, Bambi. His contribution to the film can be recognized in the style of the animals and trees in the film that reproduces the wild life of Victoria Island on Nahuel Huapi Lake, in Argentina's Patagonia.

As an artistic consultant with the Disney studios he also contributed in the creation of inexpensive package films, containing collections of cartoon shorts, and issued them to theaters during this period. The most notable and successful of these were Saludos Amigos (1942), its sequel The Three Caballeros (1945), Fun and Fancy Free (1947) and in the original movie poster of Alice in Wonderland (1951).

In 1946 Molina Campos published Vida Gaucha, a text book for Spanish students in the United States. In 1950 he won the Clarín Award gold medal in the 5th Argentine Artists Exhibition. He also worked as an actor in the short Pampa Mansa, screened in the 1956 Berlin International Film Festival which he attended as honored guest.
