= Alpargatas S.A. =

Brazilian footwear and canvas company

- Formerly: Fábrica Brasileira de Alpargatas e Calçados
- Type: Public
- Traded as: B3: ALPA3, ALPA4
- Industry: Footwear
- Founded: April 3, 1907; 119 years ago
- Founder: Robert Fraser
- Headquarters: São Paulo, Brazil
- Products: flip-flops, handbags
- Brands: Havaianas; Rothy's
- Revenue: R$ 3,91 billion (2021)
- Operating income: R$ 692 million (2021)
- Number of employees: 18,600
- Parent: Alpargatas Argentina (1907–82); Camargo Corrêa (1982–2015); J&F Investimentos (2015–17); Itaúsa (2017–present)
- Subsidiaries: Alpargatas Argentina (2007–present)
- Website: alpargatas.com.br

Alpargatas S.A. (formerly, São Paulo Alpargatas) is a Brazilian manufacturing company headquartered in São Paulo. Established in 1907, it is one of the largest Brazilian companies in the footwears and canvas business.

Alpargatas' main product is Havaianas, one of the largest Brazilian brands of rubber flip-flops introduced in 1962 and inspired by the Japanese Zori sandals.

Other products manufactured by Alpargatas S.A. include handbags, shoes, and sneakers, commercialised under its brands.

== History ==
It was founded in 1907, under the original name of "Fábrica Brasileira de Alpargatas e Calçados", by Scottish immigrant Robert Fraser in association with an English company. Fraser had also established Alpargatas factories in Argentina and Uruguay.

It started production in the Mooca district of the city of São Paulo. Already in 1909, the company –under the name São Paulo Alpargatas Company S.A.– found success in selling its products thanks to the use of sandals and canvas in coffee production.

In the 1930s, shareholding control of São Paulo Alpargatas was transferred to the Argentine company Alpargatas Argentina. However, in 1982, after a gradual process of nationalization of capital started in 1948, São Paulo Alpargatas ceased to have Argentine participation and passed to the control of the Camargo Corrêa group, its largest shareholder.

In October 1999, the company acquired more than 3% of Alpargatas Argentina, its former parent company, becoming the largest footwear company in South America, In 2007, Alpargatas S.A. (through Camargo Correa) acquired Alpargatas Argentina, which (at the moment of the purchase) had debts for US$370 million. Alpargatas São Paulo acquired a 35% of the Argentine subsidiary for US$51,7 million. Camargo Correa had previously acquired the cement company Loma Negra one year before.

In 2012, Alpargatas updated its logo. On November 2, 2015, Alpargatas sells the Topper and Rainha brands to group led by Carlos Wizard Martins for 48.7 million reais.

In November 2015, the Camargo Correa group sold Alpargatas to the J&F Investimentos conglomerate, owner of the JBS S.A. food company, for 2.67 billion reais.

On July 12, 2017, the companies Cambuhy Investimentos and Brasil Warrant (both owned by the Moreira Salles family) and the Itaúsa holding purchased Alpargatas for 3.5 billion reais. The acquisition was approved by the Administrative Council for Economic Defense also in 2017.

== See also ==
- A.C. São Paulo Alpargatas, former Alpargatas' sports club
- Jorgelina Martínez
