= Havaianas =

Brazilian footwear brand

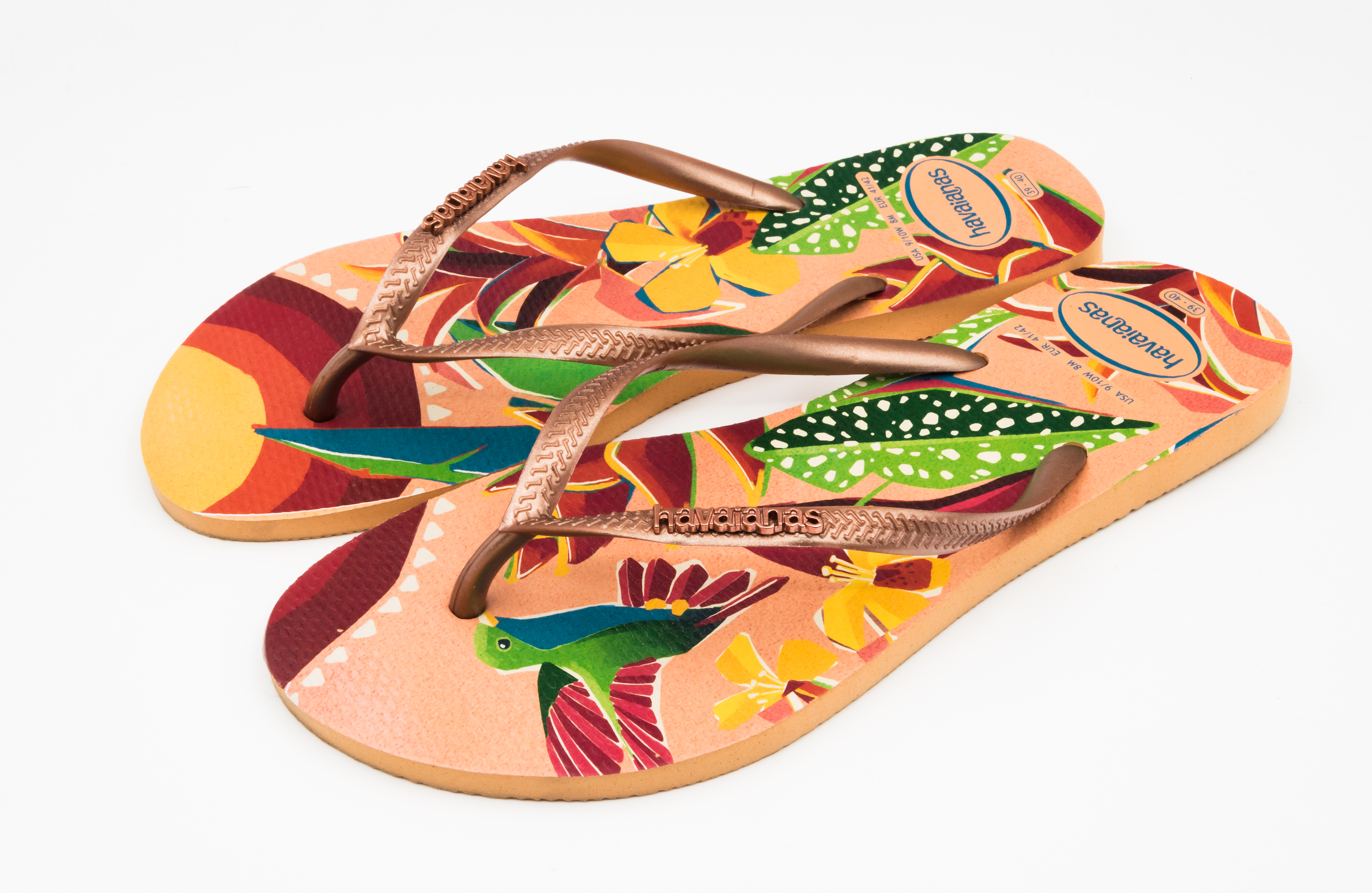
- Product type: Flip-flops
- Current owner: Alpargatas S.A.
- Country: Brazil
- Introduced: 1962; 64 years ago
- Website: havaianas.com

Havaianas (stylized in all lowercase) is a Brazilian brand of flip-flop sandals created and patented in 1962. The brand was founded by Brazilian manufacturer Alpargatas S.A. Inspired by the hybrid Hawaiian and Japanese zori sandals popularized in Hawaii, there are claims that Havaianas were the first mass-produced flip-flops made out of rubber, but this claim is false, the first mass-produced flip-flops made of rubber, were produced in Hawaii in the late 1920’s or early 1930’s and is possibly where the creators of the Havaiana brand got the idea. The name Havaianas is derived from the feminine form of the Portuguese word for "Hawaiians", the name was chosen as homage to the popular vacation destination of Hawaii, where rubber flip-flops originated.

Some iconic design features of Havaianas flip flops are the Greek artistic pattern found along the strips, the rice grain pattern engraved in the sole, and the flat rectangular brick layer pattern of the outer sole. With time Havaianas have become a symbol of Brazilian culture, being associated with the country's vibrant and carefree lifestyle, and are often worn casually, especially in beach and summer settings.

The popularity of Havaianas is generalized in Brazil and the brand controls 80% of the Brazilian rubber slippers market. The brand was featured in promotional campaigns with celebrities such as Jennifer Aniston, Kelly Slater, and in haute couture runways of fashion designers such as Jean Paul Gaultier, Saint Laurent, and Dion Lee. They are among the most sold rubber flip-flop sandals in the world, with about 200 million pairs sold every year in over 100 countries.

== History ==
=== Beginning ===
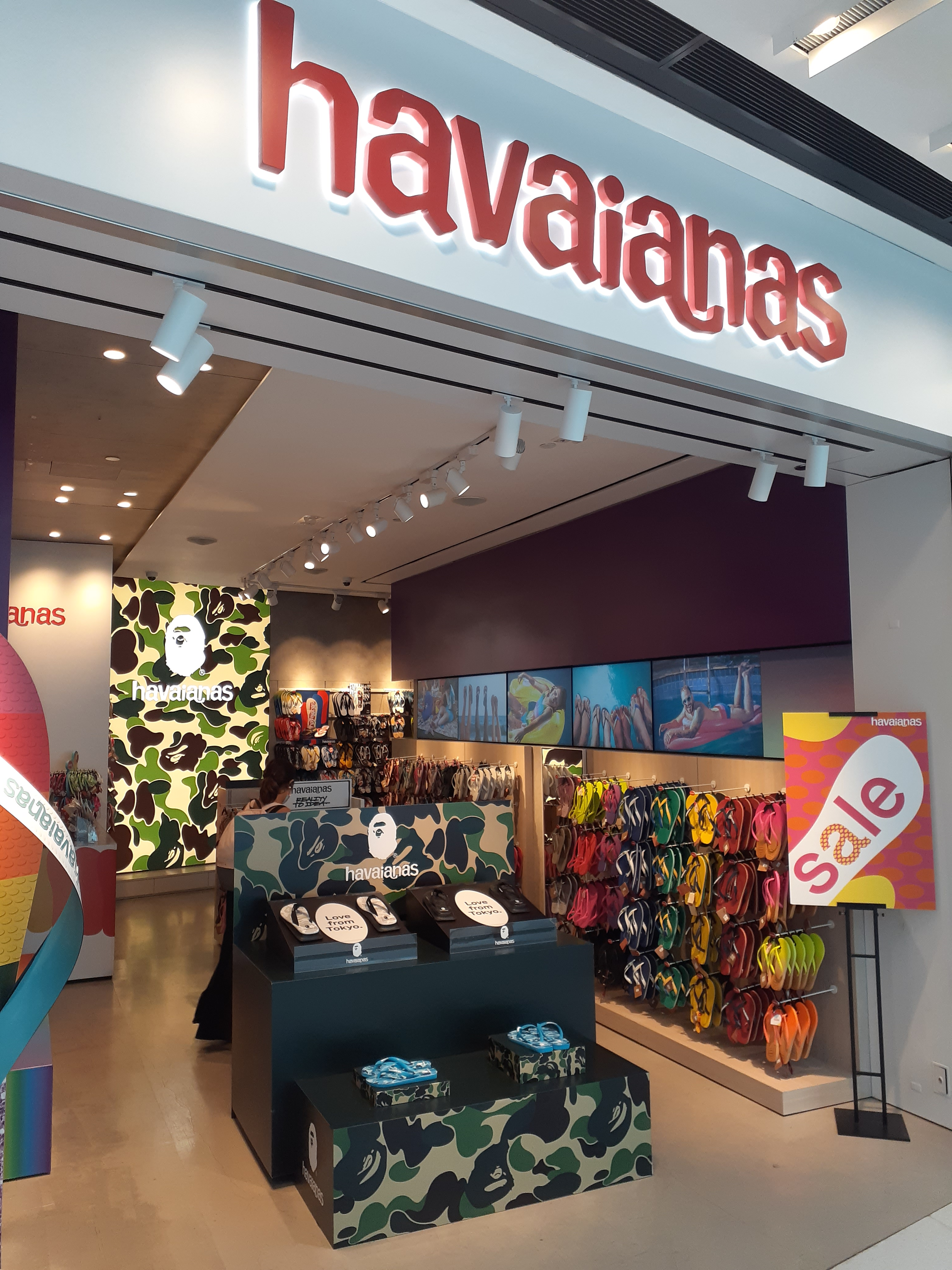
Havaianas store in Hong Kong, October 2021

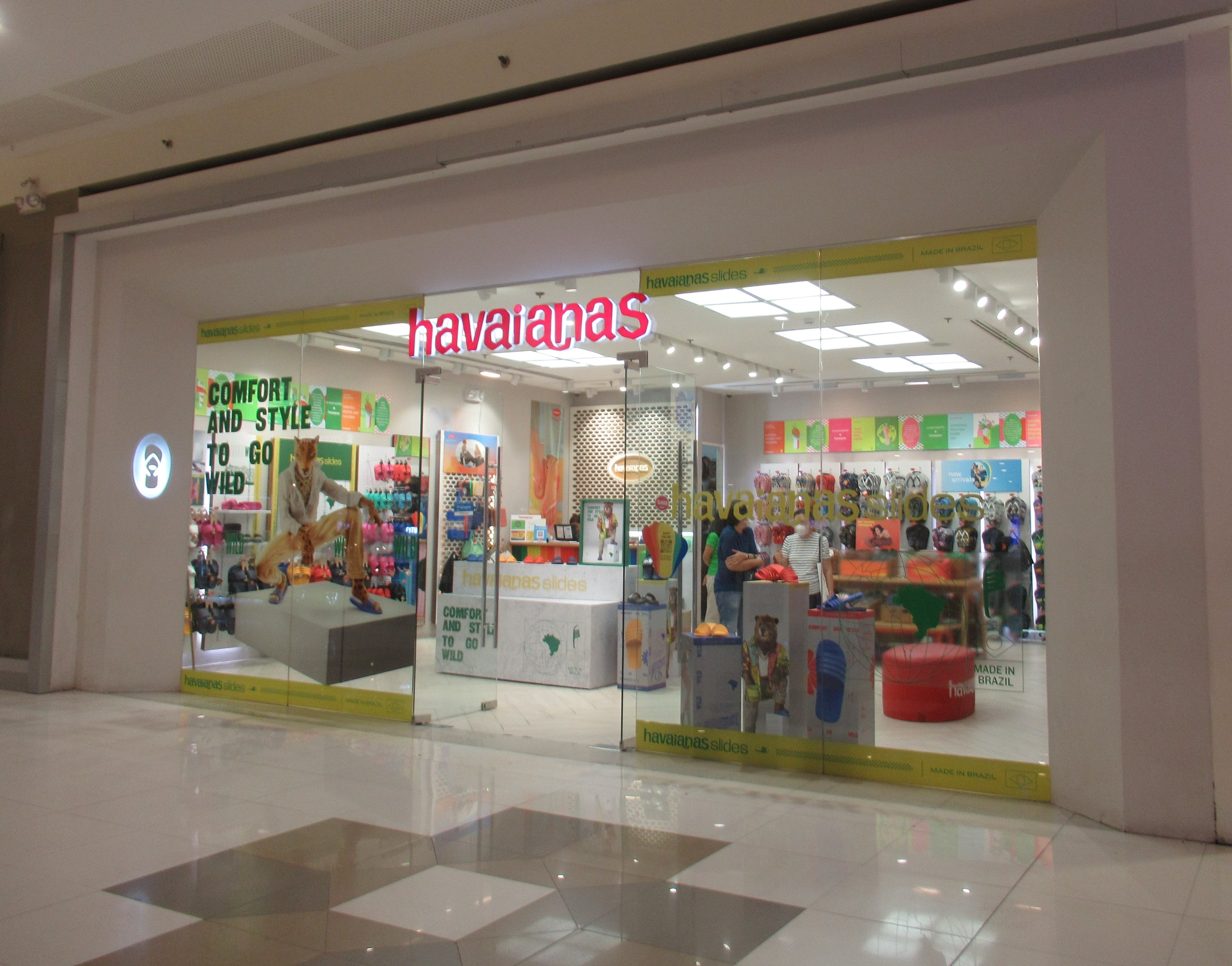
Havaianas shop in the Philippines, October 2023

In the 1960s, the flip-flop was a practical shoe worn by the working-class and was only made in a blue-and-white design. It became so associated with the poorer sector of society that it was listed as one of the fundamental goods by the Brazilian government, along with other household products. Traveling merchants sold them from the back of their vans. Variations in color and design are claimed to have all started serendipitously in 1969 when one batch of flip-flops came out to be green and suddenly gained popularity.

=== Marketing techniques ===
Havaianas officially became a global brand in 2000, despite other brands imitating its style. To branch out to the global market, several marketing strategies were employed. Angela Hirata, the director of foreign trade for Alpargatas S.A. has explained that Havaianas was marketed to both the low-end market and the high-end market for all classes to purchase the shoe. The sandal can be purchased for US$6 to $40 in Brazil, but in the United States, the sandal can range at a more inflated price from US$11 to US$75.

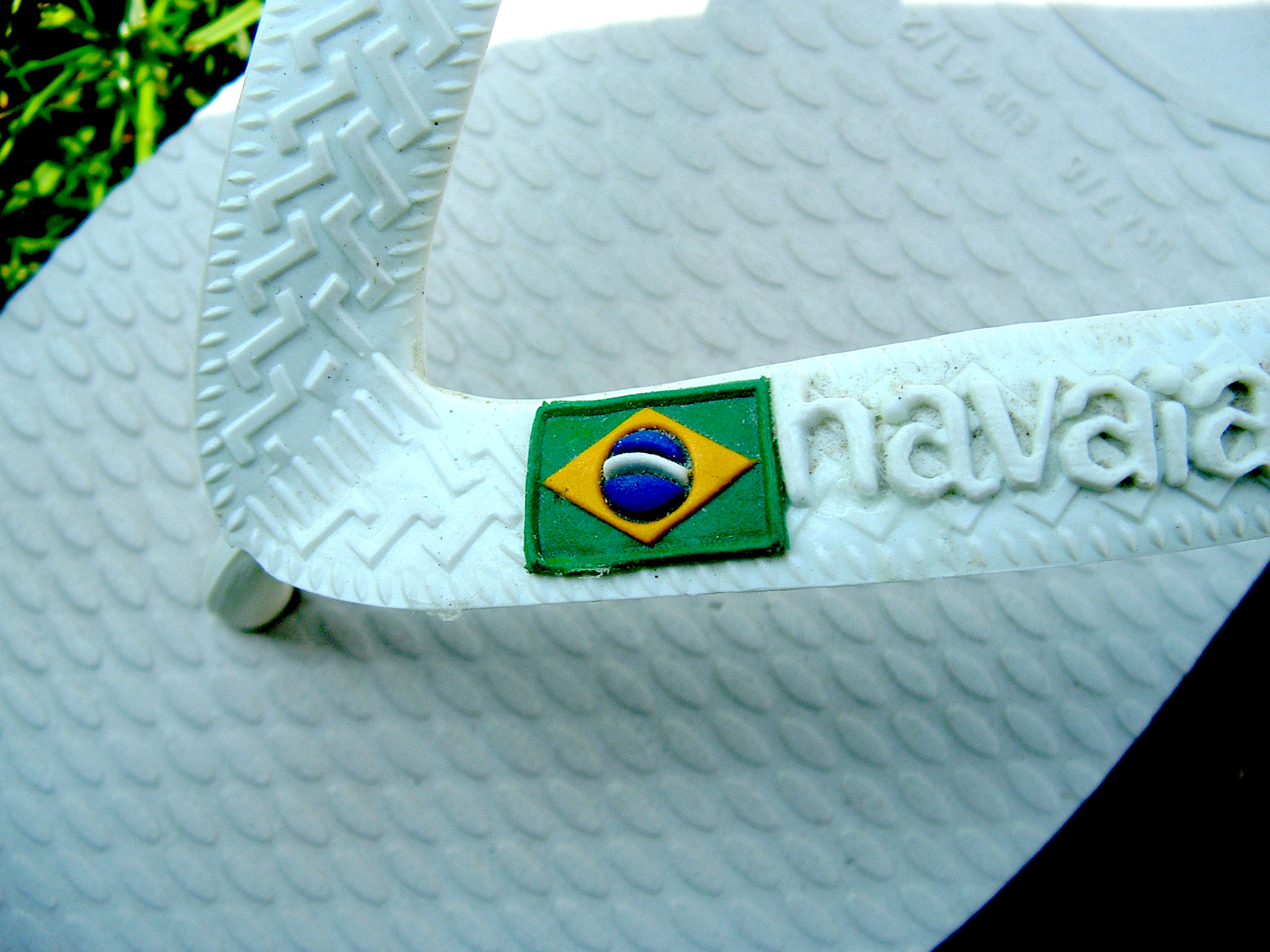
A pair of white Havaianas Brazil, originally designed to show support for the Brazilian team in the 1998 FIFA World Cup

The hallmark of Havaianas's success is innovation. Creative styles with various colors were manufactured in addition to closed-toed sandals for customers who live in cooler climates. Sandals with embellishments, like Swarovski crystals were also integrated in the new styles to be used for fashion shows and to be worn by models on runways. Another necessity was to invest greatly in sales and advertising of the shoes. Today, more advertising is seen online, but colorful print advertisements were utilized to attract consumers to Havaianas. Several rival brands have also served as a hindrance, such as Crocs, Reef, and Quiksilver. To combat these companies, Havaianas attracted new markets. The brand has also responded and remains flexible to changes in the market and consumers' preferences. For example, a drop in sales were noticed when Havaianas were being manufactured outside of Brazil and consequently, a decision was made to build another plant within Brazil. In total, the company has maintained popularity domestically and internationally with the aforementioned marketing strategies. Total revenue from Havaianas has been reported by Alpargatas S.A. to have increased from US$1.7bn in 2008 to US$2.6bn in 2011.

In 2017 it was announced that they would be sponsoring the Sahara Force India Formula One team.

=== Brand identity and extension ===
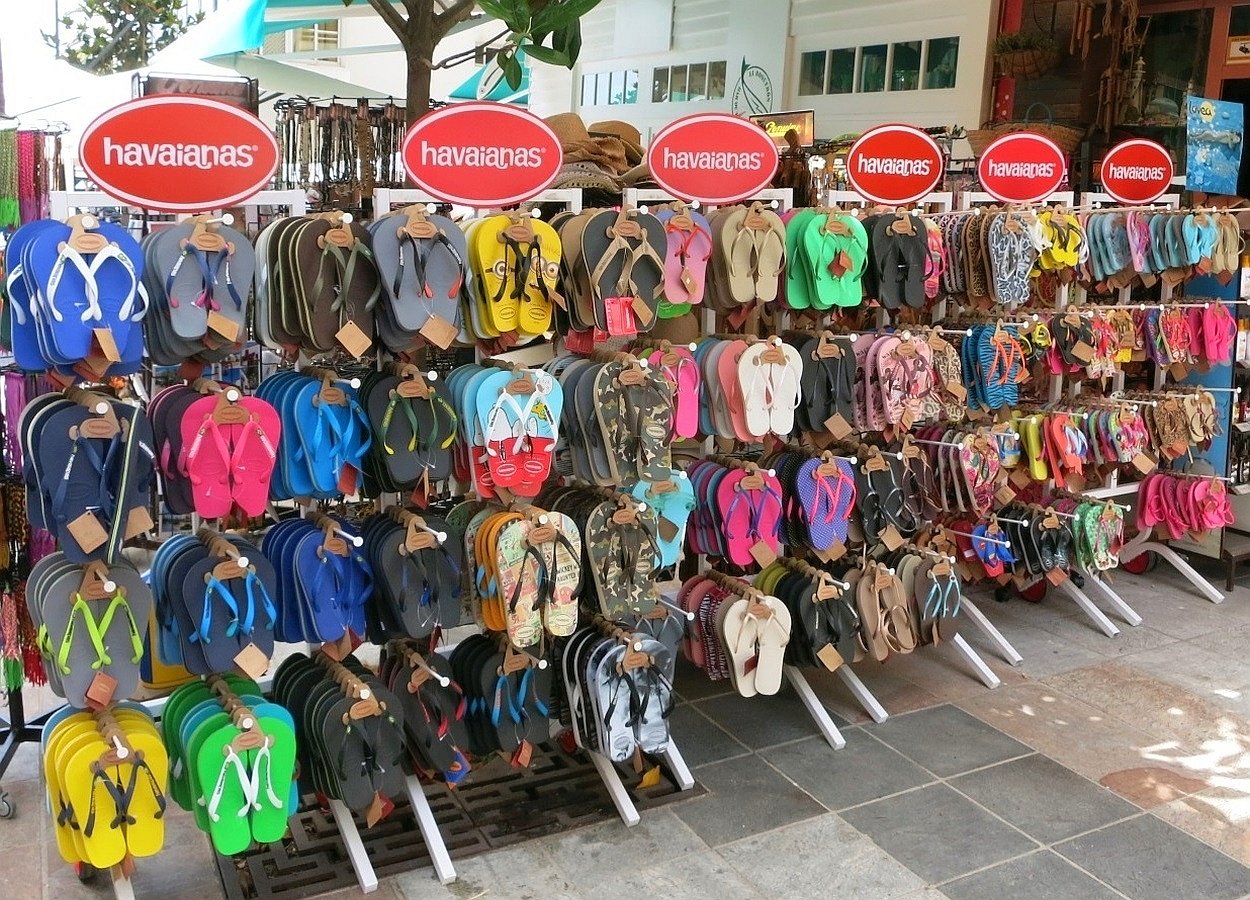
Havaianas flip-flops displayed in a shop in Costa del Sol, Spain

Brand identity also contributes to Havaianas's global outreach. The company has leveraged Brazil's positive identity to build a successful brand. As a result, advertisements for Havaianas and the shoes themselves are colorful and simple. The product's most well-known slogan is "The Legitimate Ones" since, due to its success, many other companies have launched similar products to compete with Havaianas. Entire shops devoted to the brand exist internationally and the shoes are sold in over 80 countries, including those who experience varying climates. Brand extension has been utilized as an effective way to mitigate this seasonality. The brand has extended to include towels, sunglasses, and espadrilles. In most recent years, several ranges have been launched, such as a flat range, a sunglasses range, and a clothing collection. The usage of these techniques has reached people from all classes and from different areas across the globe. Millions of people wear Havaianas, whether it be in the form of flip-flops, apparel, or accessories.

=== Present ===
In 2017 the brand was sold to a new pool of investors made up of Cambuhy Investimentos Ltda, Itaúsa Investimentos SA and the fund Brasil Warrant for 3.5 billion reais (US$1.1 billion). Previously Alpargatas S.A., Havaianas's manufacturing company, was owned by J&F Investments. Alleged discussions of bribery took place and has hurt J&F Investimentos economically. Now Alpargatas is owned by three Brazilian companies, Itaúsa, Cambuhy Investimentos and Brasil Warrant.
