= Topper (brand) =

Argentine sports equipment brand

- Industry: Apparel; Sports equipment
- Founded: 1975; 51 years ago
- Headquarters: Buenos Aires, Argentina
- Products: Athletic shoes; athletic apparel; sporting goods; accessories
- Parent: Alpargatas Argentina (1975–2013); Alpargatas S.A. (2013-2018); BR Sports (2018-present)
- Website: www.topper.com.ar

Topper is a sportswear brand established in Argentina and currently owned by Brazilian company BR Sports, headquartered in São Paulo. The brand is commercialised in South America, mainly in Brazil, Uruguay, Paraguay and Argentina, where it markets a wide range of products from footwear to clothing.

Topper was established in 1975 in Argentina as the sports brand of Alpargatas to compete against foreign sneakers manufacturers. In past years, products manufactured and commercialised under the Topper brand included football, basketball, rugby, tennis, and volleyball equipment.

== History ==
Logo used from 1975 to 2009.

Topper was founded in Argentina in 1975 by Alpargatas, the leading textile manufacturer in the country that had been established in 1885. The name "Topper" came from the dog of then president of the company, Eduardo Oxenford. During its first decade of existence, Topper launched its canvas shoe, a model of casual footwear which would soon reached not only a huge success but also became the most representative product of the firm in Argentina, and being considered a real "classic" since then.

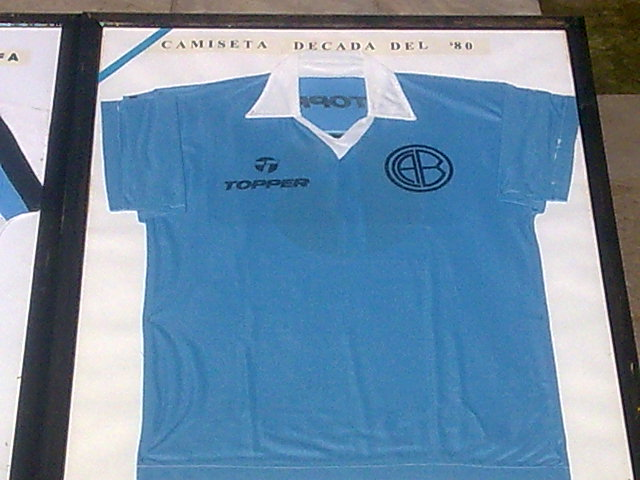
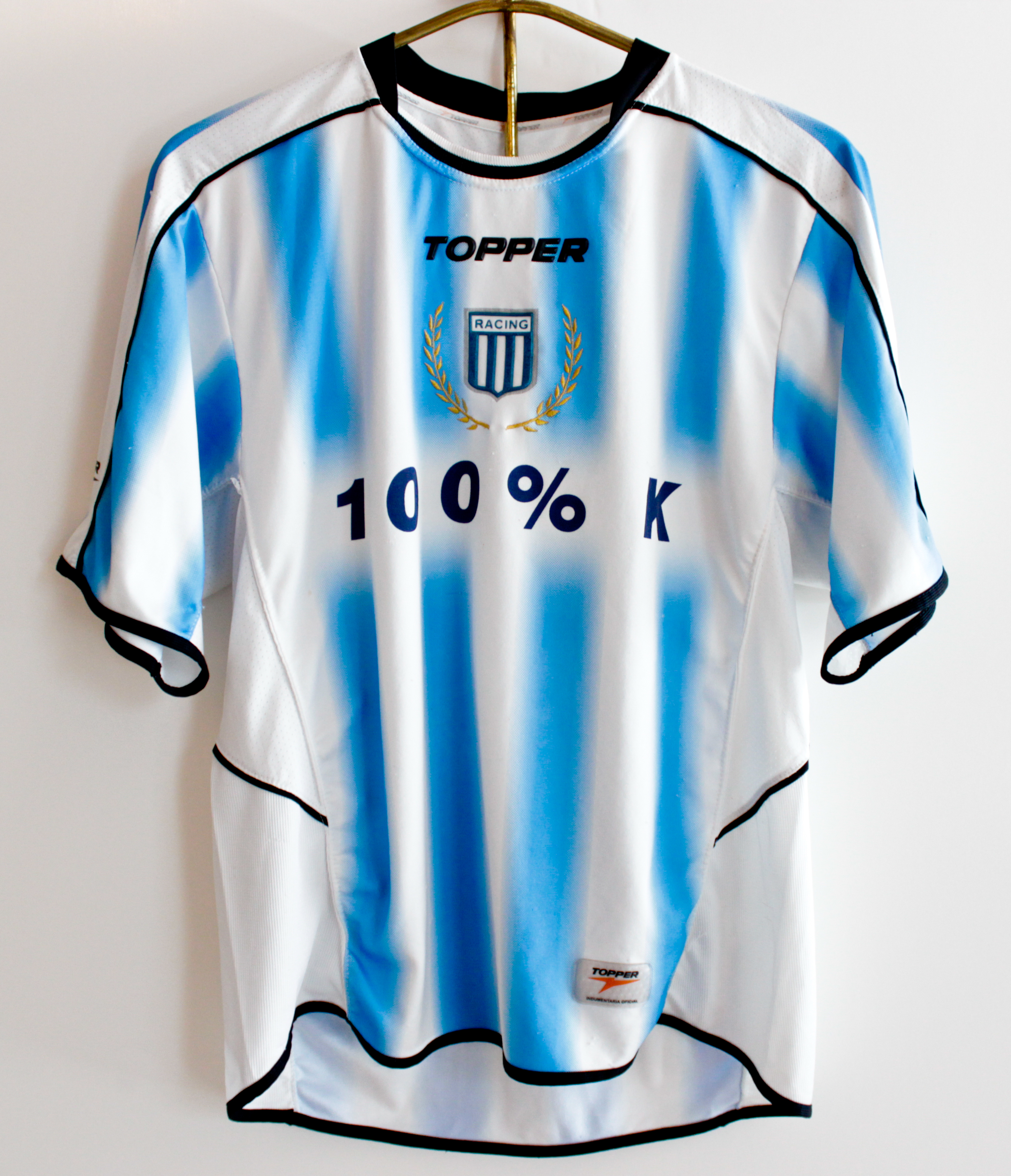
(Left): Belgrano de Córdoba shirts from the 1980s; (right): Racing Club shirt gifted to former Argentine President Néstor Kirchner

During the 1980s Topper became one of the most important sportswear brands in Argentina, signing deals with clubs such as Independiente, Ferro Carril Oeste and Estudiantes de La Plata. Most of those teams won several championships (not only in football but in basketball) during that era.

In recent years, Topper supplied garments for the basketball and volleyball national teams. The company also signed new contracts with former teams Independiente and Estudiantes and made new agreements with football teams Racing and Newell's Old Boys and rugby union clubs San Isidro and Hindú.

The brand was also the official supplier for the Argentina national rugby union team (known as Los Pumas) from 2000 to 2003.

In 2007 Alpargatas Argentina was sold to São Paulo Alpargatas (owner of Topper in Brazil), then a Camargo Correa group company.

In 2012 Topper brought a lawsuit against club Estudiantes de La Plata for $13 million. The brand accused Estudiantes of "breach of contract" due to the club had switched to German company Adidas in 2011, while the deal with Topper was still active. Adidas and Estudiantes had signed for US$3 million for 3 years. Topper alleged that there was a clause stating that Estudiantes was forced to continue being sponsored by Topper if other brands offered the same amount of money to be their uniform supplier.

In 2018, Alpargatas Brazil sold the brand Topper to BRS Comercio e Industria de Material Esportivo SA for a total of R$40 million. BRS is a holding company composed by a group of investors led by Carlos Wizard Martins. The contract signed included the license for the use of the brand "Topper" in the US and China.

== Products ==
The following chart contains all the product lines by Topper in Argentina and Brazil.

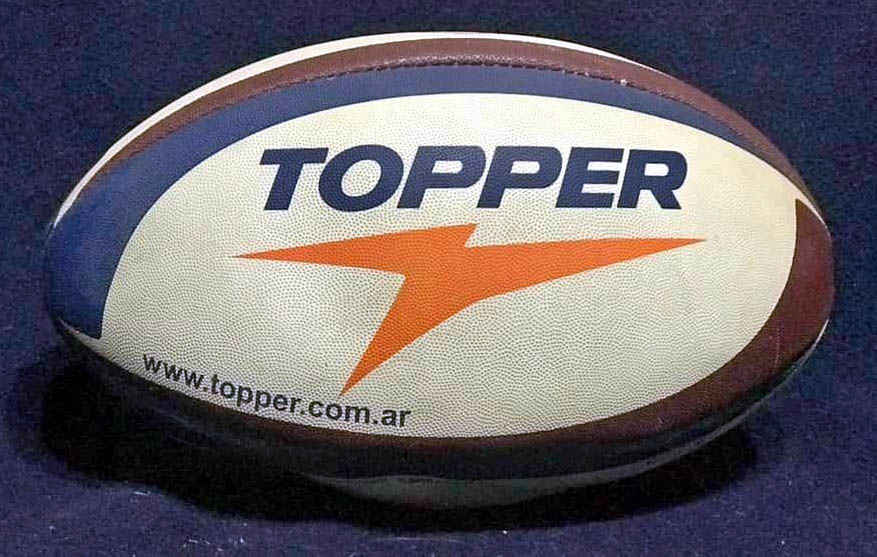
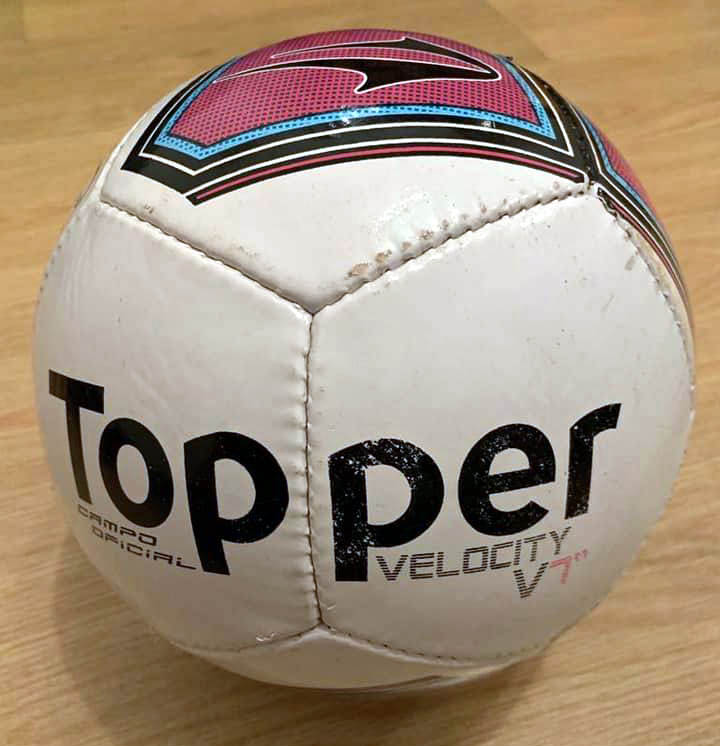
Rugby union and association football balls manufactured by Topper

Area/Sport	Range of products
Football	Balls, boots
Basketball	Balls
Casual wear	T-shirts, polo shirts, pants, shorts, hoodies, leggins, jackets, sneakers, boardshorts
Accessories	Bags, shin guards, hats, backpacks

== Past sponsorships ==
Topper has sponsored a large list of teams and associations mainly in South America, some of them are:

=== Association Football ===
==== Associations ====
- (Brazil) Série B
- (Brazil) Série C
- (Brazil) Série D
- (Brazil) Copa Nordeste
- (Brazil) FERJ
- (Brazil) FGF

==== National teams ====
- Brazil (1981–91)
- Suriname (2002–06)

==== Club teams ====
- (Argentina) All Boys (2002–03)
- (Argentina) Arsenal de Sarandí (1980–87)
- (Argentina) Atlanta (1984–86)
- (Argentina) Atlético Tucumán (1979–81, 2006-14)
- (Argentina) Belgrano (C) (1984–93, 2008-10)
- (Argentina) Boca Juniors (1996)
- (Argentina) Chacarita Juniors (1980–84)
- (Argentina) Deportivo Morón (2004-09)
- (Argentina) El Porvenir (1984–86)
- (Argentina) Estudiantes LP (1982–88, 2006–11)
- (Argentina) Ferro Carril Oeste (1979–96)
- (Argentina) Gimnasia y Esgrima LP (1980–84)
- (Argentina) Gimnasia y Tiro (1993–97)
- (Argentina) Guaraní Antonio Franco (1993–95)
- (Argentina) Independiente (1981–86, 1997–2004)
- (Argentina) Independiente Rivadavia (1993–96)
- (Argentina) Instituto (C) (1993–96)
- (Argentina) Lanús (1981–88, 1992–98)
- (Argentina) Los Andes (1984-85)
- (Argentina) Newell's Old Boys (2005–15)
- (Argentina) Olimpo (1982–95)
- (Argentina) Platense (1981–83, 1986-88)
- (Argentina) Racing Club (1995–97, 2001–05, 2014–16)
- (Argentina) River Plate (1980–81)
- (Argentina) Rosario Central (1983–92)
- (Argentina) San Lorenzo (1991–93)
- (Argentina) San Martín de Tucumán (1987–94)
- (Argentina) Tigre (2003–08)
- (Argentina) Tristán Suárez (2004–09)
- (Argentina) Vélez Sarsfield (1986–87, 2004–08, 2011–15)
- (Bolivia) Jorge Wilstermann (1994–98)
- (Bolivia) Oriente Petrolero (1993–94)
- (Bolivia) The Strongest (1998–99)
- (Brazil) Atlético Mineiro (2010–12, 2017–18)
- (Brazil) Brasil de Pelotas (2016–19)
- (Brazil) Botafogo (1999–2001, 2016–19)
- (Brazil) Ceará (1997-98, 2016–19)
- (Brazil) Corinthians (1980–89, 1999–2002)
- (Brazil) Cruzeiro (1984–85, 1998–2005)
- (Brazil) Figueirense (2018–19)
- (Brazil) Goiás (2003-05, 2017–18)
- (Brazil) Guaraní (2017–20)
- (Brazil) Grêmio (2011–14)
- (Brazil) Íbis (2020–21)
- (Brazil) Internacional (2000–05)
- (Brazil) Náutico (2016–19)
- (Brazil) Paraná (2016–19)
- (Brazil) Ponte Preta (1980-84, 1987, 2018–20)
- (Brazil) Recife (1988-90, 1999-2007)
- (Brazil) Remo (2000-05, 2016–19)
- (Brazil) São Paulo (2003–05)
- (Brazil) Vitória (1997-2003, 2017–19)
- (Chile) Curicó Unido (1996-98)
- (Chile) Deportes La Serena (2005, 2012)
- (Chile) Deportes Puerto Montt (1991, 1996)
- (Chile) Huachipato (1995–96)
- (Chile) Unión Española (1995–97)
- (Colombia) América de Cali (1997-99)
- (Colombia) Independiente Santa Fe (1997–99)
- (Spain) Badajoz (1998–99)
- (Japan) Vegalta Sendai (1994–98)
- (Mexico) Santos Laguna (1991–92)
- (Paraguay) Cerro Porteño (2001-03)
- (Paraguay) Nacional (1991-95)
- (Paraguay) Olimpia (1982, 1995-2003)
- (Paraguay) Sportivo Luqueño (2000–01)
- (Peru) Deportivo Municipal (1997-98)
- (Peru) Sport Boys (1996, 1998)
- (Suriname) Transvaal (2005-06)
- (Uruguay) Boston River (1989-94, 2009-10)
- (Uruguay) Central Español (1989–90)
- (Uruguay) Defensor Sporting (1991–92, 1997–2002)
- (Uruguay) Huracán Buceo (1980–90)
- (Uruguay) Nacional (1986–88, 1993–95)
- (Uruguay) Peñarol (1987–88)
- (Uruguay) River Plate (1990-91)
- (Uruguay) Rocha (2006–07)
- (Venezuela) Aragua (2005–07)
- (Venezuela) Carabobo (2005–07, 2008–09)
- (Venezuela) Caracas (1998–99)
- (Venezuela) Deportivo Táchira (2005)
- (Venezuela) Mineros de Guayana (2007)
- (Venezuela) Minervén (1995–97)

==== Players ====
- (Argentina) Darío Conca
- (Brazil) Marcio Amoroso
- (Brazil) Alex Meschini
- (Brazil) Diego Souza
- (Brazil) Marcos Silveira
- (Brazil) Marcelo Lomba

=== Bastketball ===
==== National teams ====
- Argentina (1979–1997, 2002–06)
- Brazil

==== Club teams ====
- (Brazil) Botafogo
- (Brazil) Franca
- (Argentina) Atenas
- (Argentina) Ferro Carril Oeste (1979–1997)
- (Argentina) Peñarol (1991–2000)
- (Argentina) Gimnasia y Esgrima LP (1980–1984)

=== Rugby Union ===
==== Associations ====
- Brazil (2010-2021)

==== National Teams ====
- Argentina (2000–03)
- Brazil (2010–2021)
- Paraguay

==== Club teams ====
- (Argentina) C.A. San Isidro
- (Argentina) Hindú

=== Tennis ===
==== Associations ====
- (Brazil) Minas Tênis Clube

==== Players ====
- (Argentina) David Nalbandian
- (Argentina) Diego Schwartzman
- (Argentina) Guillermo Vilas
- (Argentina) José Acasuso
- (Argentina) Juan Ignacio Chela
- (Argentina) Martín Vassallo Argüello
- (Argentina) Davis Cup national team
- (Argentina) Facundo Argüello
- (Brazil) Fernando Meligeni
- (Brazil) Caio Zampieri
