= Espadrille =

Casual shoe with a rope sole

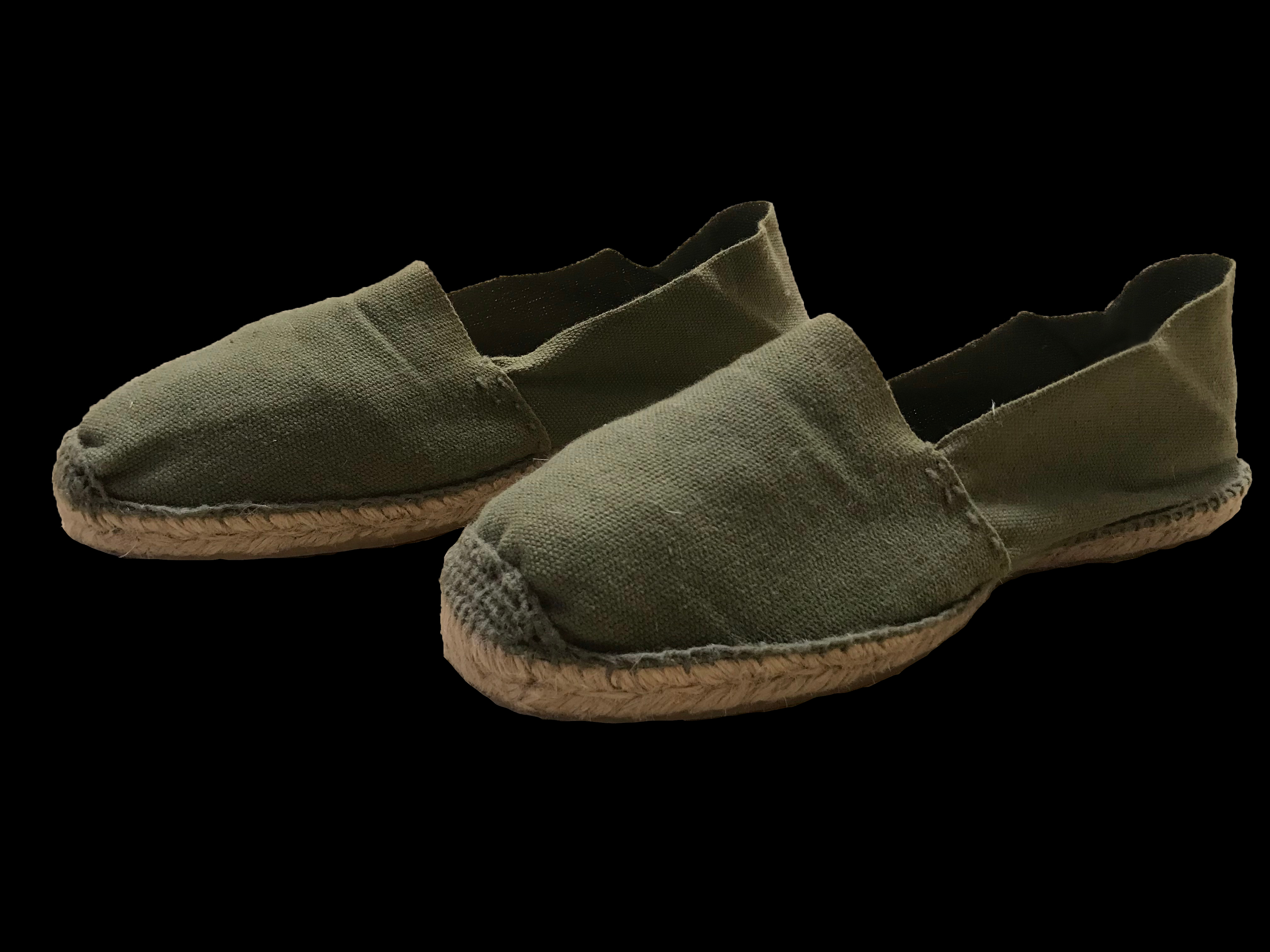
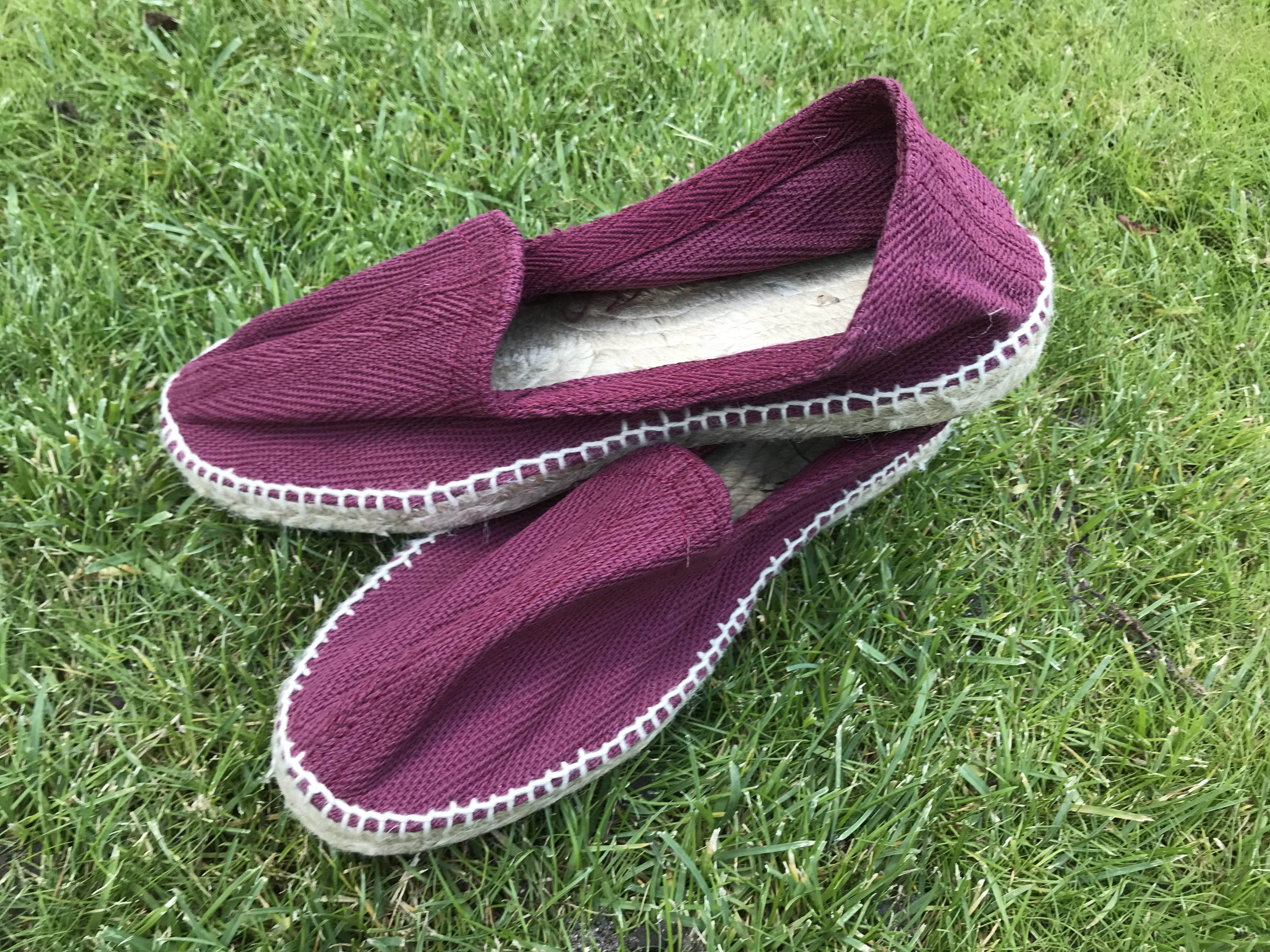
- Two examples of the most traditional espadrilles of Spain, in standard cloth and herringbone
- Type: Rope-soled shoe
- Material: Canvas or cotton fabric upper and esparto rope sole
- Place of origin: Iberia
- Introduced: 1322

Espadrilles (Spanish: alpargatas or esparteñas; Portuguese: alpercatas; Catalan: espardenyes; Basque: espartinak; French: espadrilles) are casual shoes with soles made of esparto rope. The upper is usually canvas or cotton fabric and can vary widely in style. They are usually flat but sometimes high-heeled.

Espadrilles are a typical form of Spanish summer footwear, with strong historical ties to the regions of Catalonia, Aragon, and the Basque Country. The word derives from the Catalan espardenya and refers to esparto grass, a plant indigenous to the south of Spain that is used to make ropes and basketry. Although they are still widely manufactured in Spain, some production has moved to Bangladesh, the world's largest jute producer.

Originally peasant footwear, they were popularised throughout the 20th century by many cultural figures including Picasso, Salvador Dalí and later John F. Kennedy and Yves Saint Laurent.

== Etymology ==
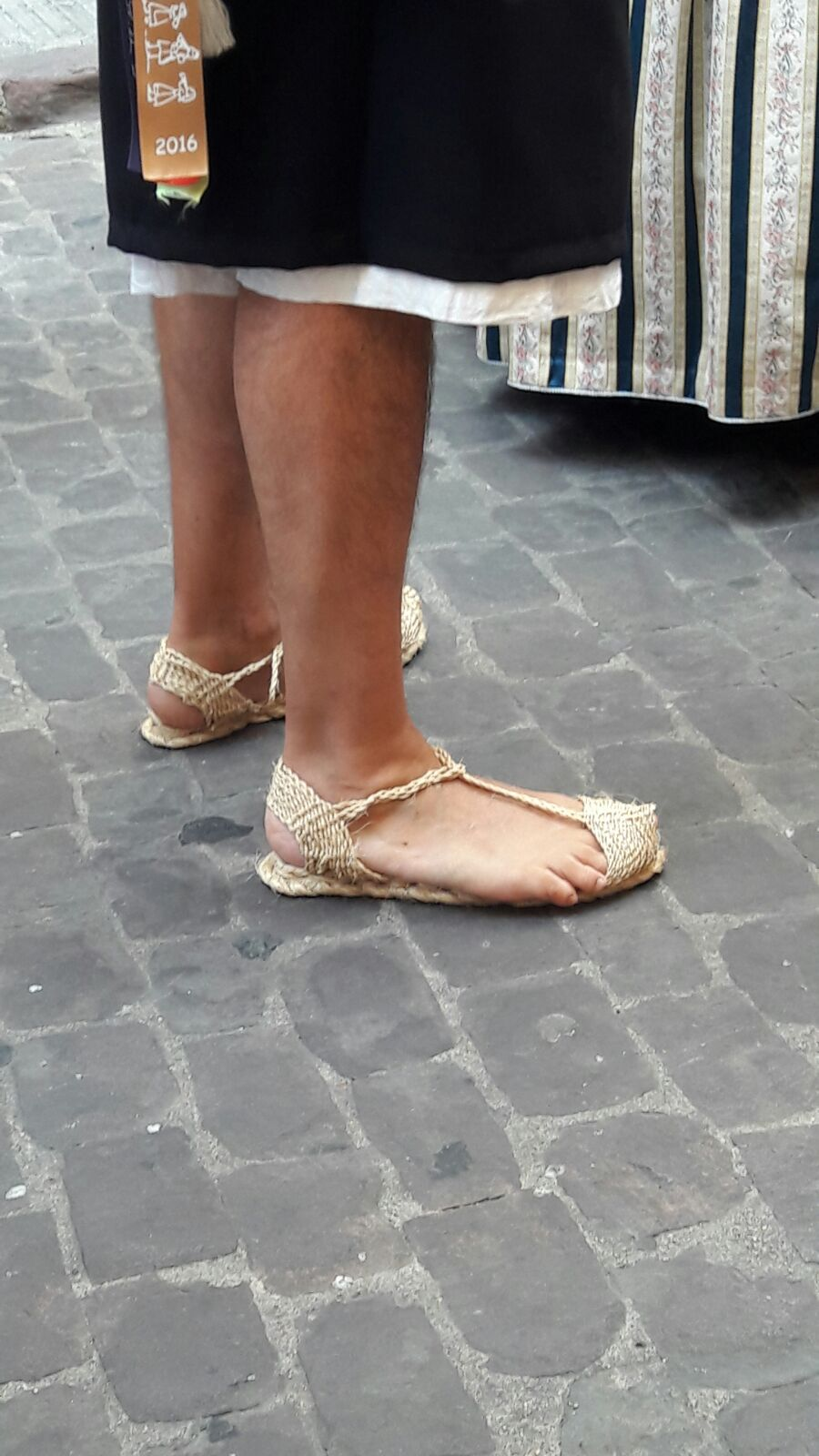
Traditional Valencian espadrille of llaurador dancer at La Mare de Déu de la Salut Festival celebrated in Algemesí

The existence of this kind of shoe in Europe is documented since at least 1322, when it was described for the first time with its current Catalan name.

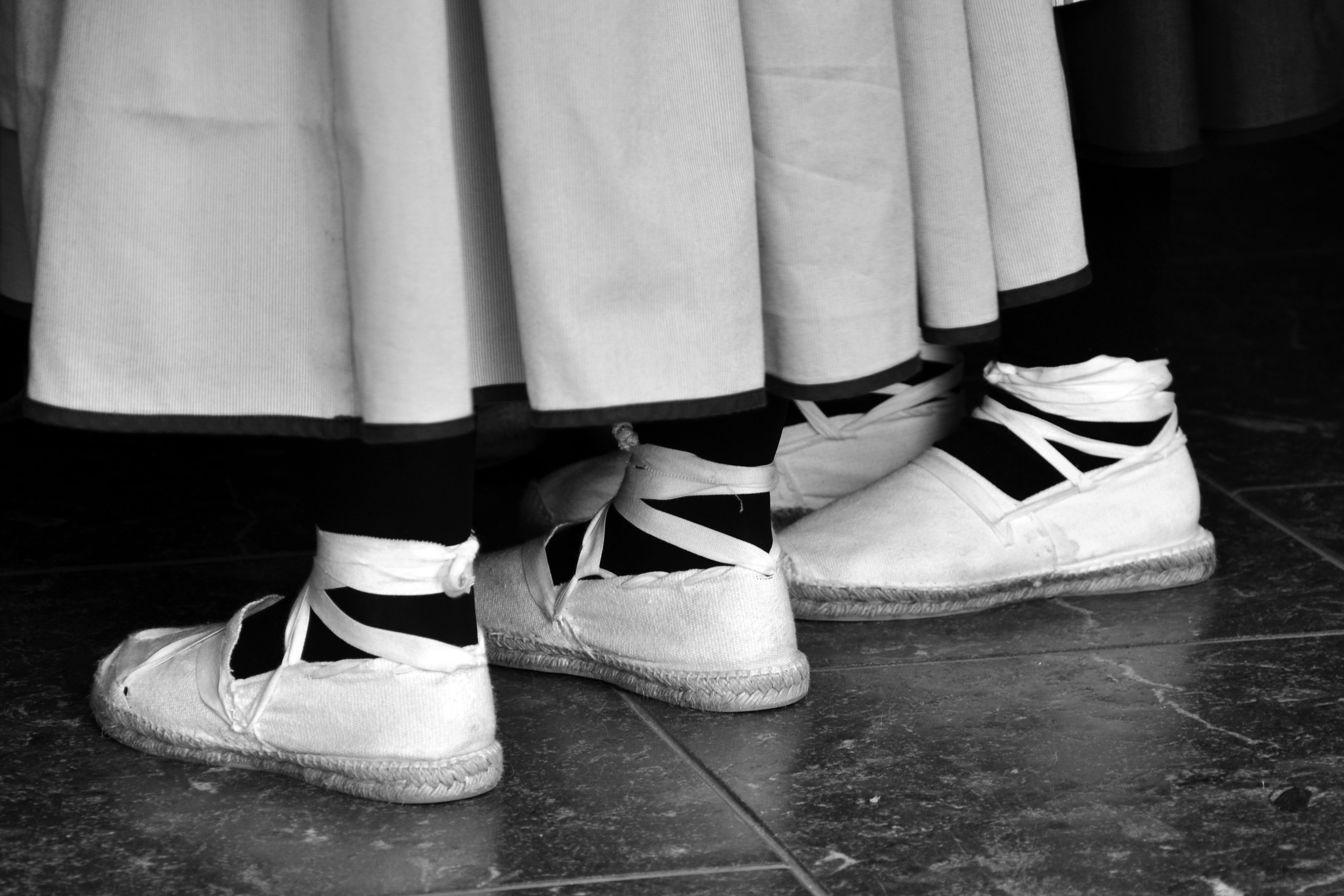
Typical clothing worn with espadrilles in the Andes

The term espadrille is French and derives from the word in the Occitan language, which comes from espardenya in Catalan. Both espardenya and esparteña refer to a type of shoes made with esparto, a tough, wiry Mediterranean grass used in making rope. Its name in the Basque region is espartina.

== History ==
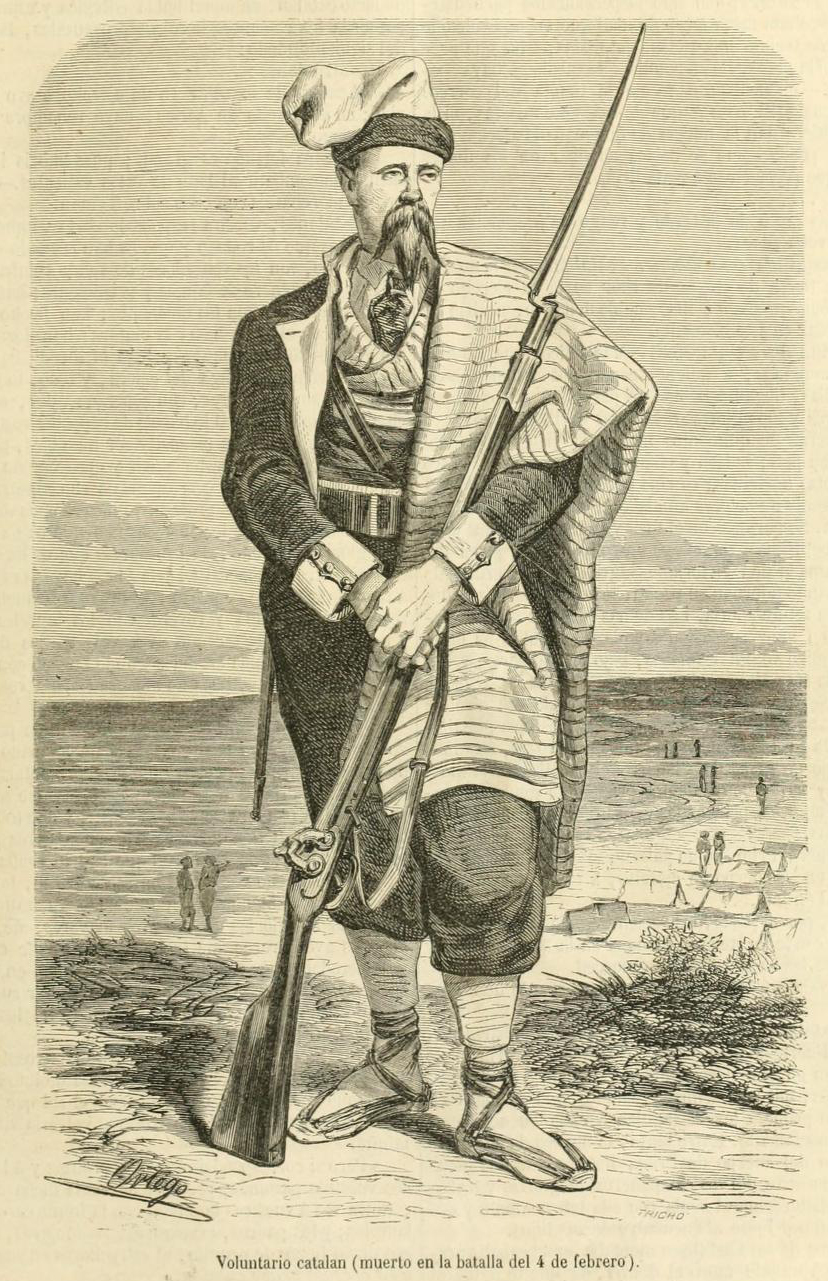
Catalan Volunteer wearing espadrilles during the War of Africa, 1859

Espadrilles have been made in the Basque Country, Catalonia and roughly all over Spain as well as the Occitania region of France. They were the usual peasant footwear since the 14th century at least, and are still being produced as from old. The oldest, most primitive form of espadrilles dates as far back as 9,500 years ago. Traditional espadrilles have a canvas upper with the toe and vamp cut in one piece and seamed to the rope sole at the sides. Often they have laces at the throat that are wrapped around the ankle to hold the shoes securely in place. Traditional espadrilles are worn by both men and women.

=== Use in Argentina and Uruguay ===
Both in Argentina and Uruguay, espadrilles (known as alpargatas) were adopted by rural workers as a substitute for the "bota de potro", part of the traditional gaucho attire, made with leather from the lower leg of the horse. Unlike other clothing, the espadrille became an essential garment for both sexes but, above all, the inseparable companion of the bombachas (knickerbockers). In the first half of the 20th century, the use of espadrilles was so common among the lower classes of the population that the company called Fábrica Argentina de Alpargatas took great importance, which used to be promoted with the artistic almanacs illustrated by Florencio Molina Campos. In 1943 and 1944, the student movement opposed to Perón began to use the slogan: "No a la dictadura de las alpargatas" ("No to espadrilles' dictatorship") which was in turn responded by the peronists: "alpargatas sí, libros, no" ("espadrilles, yes, books, no").

In the Brazilian state of Rio Grande do Sul, espadrilles, known as alpargatas, became common among rural workers and gaúchos from the late nineteenth century onward. While leather boots remained the standard riding footwear, alpargatas were widely worn for everyday work because they were lightweight, inexpensive, and comfortable. Their adoption reflected the shared gaúcho culture of the Pampas across southern Brazil, Uruguay, and Argentina, and they remained a common element of rural dress throughout the twentieth century, continuing to be worn in some rural communities and during gaúcho traditionalist events.

== Modern espadrilles ==
Once peasant footwear, then urban workers' footwear, espadrilles have grown in popularity, especially in the French Atlantic coast of the Basque Country and Spanish Mediterranean coast from Granada to Girona, where many men and women wear them during the spring and summer months. Designer espadrilles are now widely available. They are usually manufactured in Spain, France, and South Asia. Modern espadrilles are predominantly for women, though some men's shoes are made in this style.

The soles of espadrilles may be flat, platform, or wedge shaped made of natural fiber. Uppers may be made from nearly any substance and may have open or closed toes, open or closed backs, and can be slip-on or tied to the ankle with laces. Thousands of varieties of espadrilles can be found, from inexpensive bargain brands to high priced designer brands.

Espadrilles became fashionable in the United States in the 1940s. Lauren Bacall's character in the 1948 movie Key Largo wore ankle-laced espadrilles.

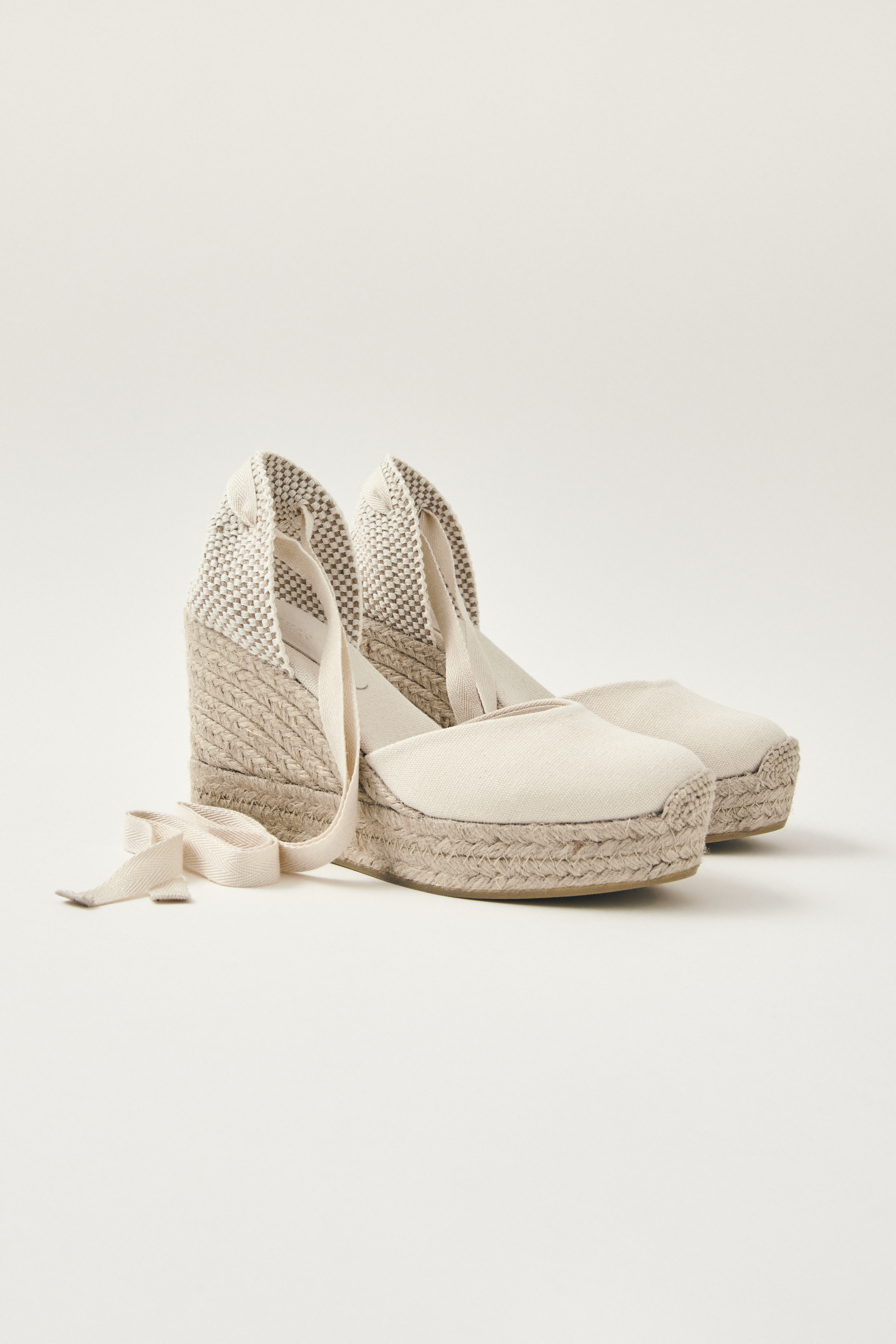
A pair of espadrilles

Wedge-shaped espadrilles were first popularized by French fashion designer Yves Saint Laurent. At a trade fair in Paris in 1970, he came into contact with the Spanish espadrille manufacturer Castañer. Yves Saint Laurent had been looking in vain for months for someone to make him a wedge espadrille. Castañer managed to interpret Yves Saint Laurent's vision and the wedge espadrilles were an instant hit, influencing fashion even today.

The espadrille style was revived in the United States in the 1980s, due to the success of Miami Vice—the shoe was worn by the character Sonny Crockett (played by Don Johnson). In 2013 at luxury shoe stores in New York City, a pair of espadrilles could cost nearly $500.

== Jute sole espadrilles ==
Due to cost and material availability, the soles of espadrilles are now commonly made with jute rope or braid. The natural bright white color of jute is a major design feature of modern espadrilles.

Bangladesh is the producer of high quality jute and has become a manufacturing center for premium quality jute soles and complete espadrilles. Ninety percent of the world's total production of complete espadrilles, as well as jute soles, is now manufactured in Bangladesh, although some manufacturers in Spain, France, and Italy import jute soles from Bangladesh to finish espadrilles in those countries. Complete espadrilles are also assembled in Argentina, Bolivia, Chile, Colombia, Paraguay and Venezuela with imported jute from Bangladesh.

Jute soles typically include fully or partially vulcanized (hardened) rubber beneath the jute soles for long-lasting espadrille shoes. Sometimes crepe rubber soles are used as out-soles, although they are less durable than their vulcanized counterparts. Jute braid soles might include heels made of wood or EVA foam.

== Manufacture ==
Assembling of a jute sole

The manufacture of espadrilles is generally more complex than that of sandals. The jute soles are the most critical part. The jute twines are first machine-braided. These braids are then manually formed into the shape of the sole and hydraulically pressed with heat to form the final shape and completed with vertical stitching through the use of espadrille needles. These basic soles are then vulcanized underneath. EVA foam or wooden heels are glued in place and more jute braids are wrapped around it to complete the soles. Uppers of different styles are then built on the jute soles to complete the espadrille.

== See also ==
- List of shoe styles
- Bast shoes, similar footwear in Balto-Slavic cultures of identical etymological derivation (from fibre used in their manufacture)
- Waraji, Japanese version
