= 2008–09 Mohun Bagan FC season =

Indian football club season

Mohun Bagan
2008–09 season
- Head coach: Karim Bencherifa
- Stadium: Salt Lake Stadium; Mohun Bagan Ground
- I-League: Runners
- Calcutta Football League: Champions
- Federation Cup: Champions
- Super Cup: Champions
- AFC Cup: Group Stage
- Top goalscorer: League: Jose Barreto (10 goals); All: Jose Barreto (22 goals)

The 2008–09 Mohun Bagan Football Club season was the club's 2nd season in I-League and 119th season since its establishment in 1889.

The start of the 2008 football season saw Mohun Bagan play a pre-season friendly on 27 May, 2008 at the Salt Lake Stadium against a touring FC Bayern Munich side. The match was hosted as a tribute to the retiring Oliver Kahn:the legendary German goalkeeper.

The team won the Calcutta Football League for the 2nd Consecutive time, they also won the Federation Cup and the Super Cup and they finished 2nd in the I-League with 43 points in 22 games, winning 13, drawing 4, and losing 5 in the process.

In the AFC Cup, Bagan could not win any of the matches in the group stage as they finished last without any points and were eliminated.

The Brazilian International Jose Barreto was their top goalscorer during the season, scoring 22 goals in all competitions.

== Squad ==
Note: Flags indicate national team as defined under FIFA eligibility rules; some limited exceptions apply. Players may hold more than one non-FIFA nationality.

No.	Pos.	Nation	Player
1	GK	IND	Sangram Mukherjee
13	GK	IND	Raju Ekka
21	GK	IND	Chirodeep Chattopadhyay
31	GK	IND	Shilton Paul
2	DF	IND	Sudhakaran Kumar
3	DF	IND	Manju
4	DF	IND	Deepak Mondal
5	DF	IND	Habibur Rehman Mondal
14	DF	NGR	Peter Odafe
18	DF	IND	Karan Atwal
—	DF	IND	Sanjeev Kumar
24	DF	IND	Rino Anto
27	DF	IND	Nallappan Mohanraj
29	DF	IND	Anand Vasan
33	DF	IND	Suman Bose
6	MF	IND	Henry Gangte
8	MF	IND	Tapan Maity

No.	Pos.	Nation	Player
11	MF	IND	Ishfaq Ahmed
12	MF	IND	Branco Cardozo
17	MF	IND	Rahul Kumar
19	MF	IND	Shylo Malsawmtluanga
20	MF	IND	Rakesh Masih
25	MF	IND	Sargolsem James Singh
35	MF	IND	Sanjoy Boro
37	MF	IND	Lalkamal Bhowmick
36	MF	IND	Souvik Chakraborty
23	MF	IND	Lalramluaha
9	FW	IND	Lalawmpuia Pachuau
10	FW	BRA	José Barreto
15	FW	IND	Bhaichung Bhutia
16	FW	IND	James Lukram Singh
22	FW	IND	Kartick Kisku
30	FW	BRA	Marcos Pereira
34	FW	IND	Malsumzwala

== Pre-Season Friendly ==
The start of the 2008 football season saw Mohun Bagan play a pre-season friendly on 27 May, 2008 at the Salt Lake Stadium against a touring FC Bayern Munich side. The match was hosted as a tribute to the retiring Oliver Kahn:the legendary German goalkeeper.

27 May 2008	Mohun Bagan	0–3	FC Bayern Munich	Kolkata
	Branco Cardozo (red card) 82'	Report	Jan Schlaudraff 18', 52'; Ze Roberto 37'; Breno (red card) 82'	Stadium: Salt Lake Stadium; Attendance: 120,000; Referee: Subrato Sarkar

== Overview ==
=== Overall ===
Competition	First match	Last match	Final position
Calcutta Football League	11 July 2008	12 September 2008	Champions
I-League	27 September 2008	16 April 2009	Runners
Federation Cup	12 December 2008	21 December 2008	Champions
AFC Cup	10 March 2009	19 May 2009	Group Stage
Super Cup	26 April 2009		Champions

=== Overview ===
Competition	Record							
Competition	Pld	W	D	L	GF	GA	GD	Win %
Calcutta Football League	14	9	4	1	24	11	+13	64.29
Federation Cup	5	4	0	1	6	4	+2	80.00
AFC Cup	6	0	0	6	1	19	−18	0.00
I-League	22	13	4	5	30	20	+10	59.09
Super Cup	1	1	0	0	2	1	+1	100.00
Total	48	27	8	13	63	55	+8	56.25

Last updated: 1 June 2009
Source: Competitions

== Calcutta Football League ==
Mohun Bagan won the Calcutta Football League for the 2nd time. with 31 points in 14 games, winning 9, drawing 4, and losing 1 in the process.

11 July 2008 1	Peerless SC	0–3	Mohun Bagan	Kolkata, India
		MBAC; Report	Lalawmpuia Pachuau 1', 14'; Branco Cardozo 81'	Stadium: Mohun Bagan Ground; Referee: Dhanapati Roy; Man of the Match: Lalawmpuia Pachuau (Mohun Bagan)

15 July 2008 2	Mohun Bagan	3–1	Chirag United	Kolkata, India
	Barreto 26', 52', 59'	MBAC; Report	Achinta Sen 70'	Stadium: Mohun Bagan Ground; Referee: Minangshu Bhattacharya; Man of the Match: Barreto (Mohun Bagan)

18 July 2008 3	Railway FC	0–3	Mohun Bagan	Kolkata, India
		MBAC; Report	Shylo Malsawmtluanga 37', 43', 81'	Referee: Prabir Dhar; Man of the Match: Shylo Malsawmtluanga (Mohun Bagan)

22 July 2008 4	Calcutta Port Trust	0–0	Mohun Bagan	Kolkata, India
		MBAC; Report		Stadium: Mohun Bagan Ground; Referee: Biplob Poddar; Man of the Match: Peter Odafe (Mohun Bagan)

28 July 2008 5	Mohun Bagan	1–2	Mohammedan SC	Kolkata, India
	Lalawmpuia Pachuau 56'	MBAC; Report	Theodore Sunday Wrobeh 23'; Nallappan Mohanraj 90+3' (o.g.)	Stadium: Salt Lake Stadium; Referee: Rathin Mukherjee; Man of the Match: Theodore Sunday Wrobeh (Mohammedan SC)

2 August 2008 6	George Telegraph SC	2–3	Mohun Bagan	Kolkata, India
	Freebone Ipekere 46'; Francis Chubueze Maduako 80'	Summary	Lalawmpuia Pachuau 22'; Shylo Malsawmtluanga 33'; Peter Odafe 90'	Stadium: Mohun Bagan Ground; Referee: Debjit Das; Man of the Match: Subho Kumar(George Telegraph)

5 August 2008 7	Mohun Bagan	2–1	East Bengal	Kolkata
	Lalawmpuia Pachuau 72', 82'	Summary	Alvito D'Cunha 19'	Stadium: Salt Lake Stadium; Referee: Minangshu Bhattacharya; Man of the Match: Lalawmpuia Pachuau (Mohun Bagan)

11 Aug 2008 8	Mohun Bagan	2–1	Peerless SC	Kolkata, India
	Lalawmpuia Pachuau 31'; Barreto 51'	MBAC; Report	Uzozle Emmanuel Junior 21'	Referee: Rathin Mukherjee; Man of the Match: Barreto (Mohun Bagan)

17 August 2008 9	Chirag United	1–1	Mohun Bagan	Kolkata, India
	Lalmalswama Hmar 5'	Report1; Report2	Barreto 35'	Stadium: Mohun Bagan Ground; Referee: Tushar Kanti Guha; Man of the Match: Lalmalswama Hmar (Mohun Bagan)

26 August 2008 10	Mohun Bagan	1–0	Railway FC	Kolkata, India
	Habibur Rehman Mondal 43'	Report		Stadium: Salt Lake Stadium; Referee: Barun Saha; Man of the Match: Kartick Kisku (Mohun Bagan)

31 August 2008 11	Mohammedan SC	1–1	Mohun Bagan	Kolkata, India
	Theodore Sunday Wrobeh 45+2' (pen.)	MBAC; Report	Habibur Rehman Mondal 90+2'	Stadium: Salt Lake Stadium; Referee: Dhanapati Roy; Man of the Match: Sheikh Azim (Mohammedan SC)

4 September 2008 12	Mohun Bagan	2–1	Calcutta Port Trust	Kolkata, India
	Lalawmpuia Pachuau 3'; Manju 64'	MBAC; Report	Avijit Ghosh 47'	Stadium: Mohun Bagan Ground; Referee: Biplob Poddar; Man of the Match: Peter Odafe (Mohun Bagan)

9 September 2008 13	Mohun Bagan	1–0	George Telegraph SC	Kolkata, India
	Barreto 30'; Ishfaq Ahmed (yellow card) 90+3' (yellow-red card) 90+4'	Report		Stadium: Mohun Bagan Ground; Referee: Rathin Mukherjee; Man of the Match: Subho Kumar (George Telegraph)

12 September 2008 14	East Bengal	1–1	Mohun Bagan	Kolkata
	Edmilson Marques Pardal 84'	Report	Jose Ramirez Barreto 25' (pen.)	Stadium: Salt Lake Stadium; Referee: Minangshu Bhattacharya; Man of the Match: Rakesh Masih (Mohun Bagan)

== I-League ==
=== League table ===
Pos	Team	Pld	W	D	L	GF	GA	GD	Pts	Qualification or relegation
1	Churchill Brothers	22	13	7	2	53	23	+30	46	2010 AFC Champions League Qualifying play-off
2	Mohun Bagan	22	13	4	5	30	20	+10	43	
3	Sporting Goa	22	13	4	5	28	20	+8	43	
4	Dempo	22	8	7	7	35	26	+9	31	
5	Mahindra United	22	8	7	7	28	22	+6	31	

Source: Soccerway
Rules for classification: 1) points; 2) goal difference; 3) number of goals scored.

=== Results summary ===
Overall								Home						Away					
Pld	W	D	L	GF	GA	GD	Pts	W	D	L	GF	GA	GD	W	D	L	GF	GA	GD
22	13	4	5	30	20	+10	43	8	2	1	16	5	+11	5	2	4	14	15	−1

Last updated: 1 June 2009.
Source: Flashscore

=== Results by round ===
Round	1	2	3	4	5	6	7	8	9	10	11	12	13	14	15	16	17	18	19	20	21	22
Ground	H	H	A	A	H	A	H	H	A	H	H	A	A	H	H	A	A	A	A	H	H	A
Result	L	D	L	D	D	W	W	W	W	W	W	W	W	W	W	L	L	W	D	W	W	L

Source: Flashscore
A = Away; H = Home; W = Win; D = Draw; L = Loss

=== Fixtures & results ===
Win Draw Loss

27 September 2008; 18:30 IST 1	Mohun Bagan	1–2	Mumbai FC	Barasat Stadium
	Pachau Lalam Puia 77'	Report	Abel Hammond 9'; Kalia Kulothungan 24', (yellow card) 52'; Ahmed Felix Aboagye (yellow card) 51'; Kalyan Chaubey (yellow card) 73'	Referee: A Arjunan; Man of the Match: Abel Hammond (Mumbai FC)

3 October 2008; 18:30 IST 2	Mohun Bagan	1–1	Air-India	Salt Lake Stadium
	Lal Kamal Bhowmick (yellow card) 20'; Branco Cardozo 70'	Report	Soccor Velho 43'	Referee: Sreenivasan Suresh; Man of the Match: Michael Segum Tayo (Air India)

11 October 2008; 16:00 IST 3	Sporting Clube de Goa	2–0	Mohun Bagan	Jawaharlal Nehru – Fatorda Stadium
	Wilton Gomes 25'; Nathaniel Amos 51'	Report		Referee: P Bhaskar; Man of the Match: Wilton Gomes (Sporting Clube)

19 October 2008; 18:30 IST 4	Mohammedan SC	1–1	Mohun Bagan	Salt Lake Stadium
	Goutam Thakur 3'; Anit Ghosh (yellow card) 37'; Tharangachan Tungshang (yellow card) 60'; Mir Farooq Hyder (yellow card) 74'	Report	Jose Ramirez Barreto 23', (yellow card) 89'; Peter Odafe (yellow card) 74'; Lalkamal Bhowmick (yellow card) 84'	Referee: Sreenivasan Suresh

25 October 2008 5	Mohun Bagan	1–1	East Bengal	Kolkata
17:00 IST	Bhaichung Bhutia 2'; Rakesh Masih (yellow card) 49'	Report; MBAC	Syed Rahim Nabi 39'; Surkumar Singh (red card) 49'; Subrata Pal (yellow card) 49'; Mehtab Hussain (yellow card) 52'	Stadium: Salt Lake Stadium; Referee: Pradeep Kumar; Man of the Match: Ishfaq Ahmed (Mohun Bagan)

31 October 2008 6	Dempo SC	0–1	Mohun Bagan	Jawaharlal Nehru – Fatorda Stadium
	Climax Lawrence (yellow card) 40'	Report	Anandavashan (yellow card) 21' (yellow-red card) 29'; Jose Ramirez Barreto (yellow card) 30', (goal) 52' (pen.); Sangram Mukherjee (yellow card) 67'	Referee: Pradeep Kumar; Man of the Match: Deepak Mondal (Mohun Bagan)

9 November 2008 7	Mohun Bagan	1–0	Churchill Brothers	Salt Lake Stadium
	Pachau Lalam Puia 14'; Deepak Mondal (yellow card) 58'	Report		Referee: Pradeep Kumar; Man of the Match: Marcos Pereira (Mohun Bagan)

16 November 2008 8	Mohun Bagan	2–0	JCT FC	Salt Lake Stadium
	Peter Odafe (yellow card) 12' (yellow-red card) 43'; Ishfaq Ahmed 15'; Jose Ramirez Barreto 30' (pen.); Bhaichung Bhutia (yellow card) 44'	Report		Referee: Dinesh Nair; Man of the Match: Ishfaq Ahmed (Mohun Bagan)

20 November 2008 9	Vasco Sports Club	1–2	Mohun Bagan	Jawaharlal Nehru – Fatorda Stadium
	Lalnun Puia 29'	Report	Rakesh Masih 31'; Shylo Malsawmtluanga (yellow card) 35'; Lalkamal Bhowmick 55'	Referee: Pratap Singh; Man of the Match: Rakesh Masih (Mohun Bagan)

24 November 2008 10	Mohun Bagan AC	1–0	Mahindra United	Salt Lake Stadium
	Deepak Mondal (yellow card) 26'; Bhaichung Bhutia 46'; Sangram Mukherjee (yellow card) 90+4'	Report	Debabrata Roy (yellow card) 49'	Referee: PK Bose; Man of the Match: Marcos Pereira (Mohun Bagan)

29 November 2008 11	Mohun Bagan	2–0	Chirag United	Kolkata, India
15:30 IST	Barreto 16', (yellow card) 68'; Bhaichung Bhutia 30'; Rakesh Masih (yellow card) 37'; Marcos Pereira (yellow card) 76'	MBAC	Subhasish Roy Chowdhury (yellow card) 29'; Muritala Ali (yellow card) 57'	Stadium: Salt Lake Stadium; Referee: A Arjunan; Man of the Match: Barreto (Mohun Bagan)

23 January 2009 12	Mumbai FC	0–3	Mohun Bagan AC	Cooperage Ground, Mumbai
15:30 IST		Report	Bhaichung Bhutia 73'; Barreto 80'; Pachau Lalam Puia 90'	Referee: Pradeep Kumar; Man of the Match: Bhaichung Bhutia (Mohun Bagan)

1 February 2009 13	Air-India	1–2	Mohun Bagan AC	Cooperage Ground, Mumbai
15:30 IST	Singam Subhash Singh 19'; Agnelo Picardo (yellow card) 51'; Uttam Singh (yellow card) 63' (yellow-red card) 91'	Report	Barreto 45', 69'	Referee: OP Thakur; Man of the Match: Barreto (Mohun Bagan)

6 February 2009 14	Mohun Bagan AC	1–0	Sporting Clube de Goa	Kolkata
18:30 IST	Bhaichung Bhutia 76'	Report	Wilton Gomes (yellow card) 5'; Joseph Pereira (yellow card) 79'; Sarmananda Singh (yellow card) 82'	Stadium: Salt Lake Stadium; Referee: PK Bose; Man of the Match: Bhaichung Bhutia (Mohun Bagan)

15 February 2009 15	Mohun Bagan AC	1–0	Mohammedan Sporting Club	Salt Lake Stadium
	James Lukram Singh 14'	Report		Referee: Praveen Kumar; Man of the Match: Sheikh Azim (Mohammedan Sporting Club)

22 February 2008 16	East Bengal	3–0	Mohun Bagan	Kolkata
18:30 IST	Syed Rahim Nabi 22', 40'; Sunil Chhetri 47'	Report		Stadium: Salt Lake Stadium; Referee: Dinesh Nair; Man of the Match: Syed Rahim Nabi (East Bengal)

4 March 2009 17	Churchill Brothers SC	3–1	Mohun Bagan AC	Jawaharlal Nehru Stadium
16:15 IST	Odafe Onyeka Okolie 45'; Ogba Kalu Nnanna 57', 77'	Report	Marcos Pereira (yellow card) 23'; Jose Ramirez Barreto 28'; Peter Odafe (yellow card) 42'	Referee: Pradeep Kumar (Tamil Nadu); Man of the Match: Ogba Kalu Nnanna (Churchill Brothers)

23 March 2009 18	Chirag United SC	1–2	Mohun Bagan AC	Barasat Stadium
18:30 IST	Kingshuk Debnath (yellow card) 52'; Snehasish Chakraborty 77'; Goutam Debnath (yellow card) 83'	Report; MBAC	Arnab Mondal 45' (o.g.); Bhaichung Bhutia 79'	Referee: Pradeep Kumar

28 March 2009 19	JCT FC	1–1	Mohun Bagan AC	Ludhiana
15:30 IST	Rahul Kumar 80' (o.g.)	Report	Manju 10'	Stadium: Guru Nanak Stadium; Referee: A Arjunan; Man of the Match: Ishfaq Ahmed (Mohun Bagan)

2 April 2009 20	Mohun Bagan AC	3–0	Vasco SC	Kolkata
18:30 IST	Ishfaq Ahmed 42'; Barreto 62'; Manju 81'	Report	Covan Lawrence (yellow card) 14'	Stadium: Barasat Stadium; Referee: Rizwan ul-Haq; Man of the Match: Milagrio Madeira (Vasco)

12 April 2009 21	Mohun Bagan AC	2–1	Dempo SC	Kolkata
18:30 IST	Bhaichung Bhutia (yellow card) 26'; Barreto 28'; Marcos Pereira (yellow card) 35'; Lalkamal Bhowmick (yellow card) 68'; Manju 90+4' , (yellow card) 90+5'; Rakesh Masih (yellow card) 90+5'	Report	Valeriano Rebello (yellow card) 25'; Mahesh Gawli (yellow card) 38'; Ranti Martins 55', (yellow card) 66'	Stadium: Barasat Stadium; Referee: Rizwan ul-Haq; Man of the Match: Barreto (Mohun Bagan)

16 April 2009 22	Mahindra United	2–1	Mohun Bagan AC	Delhi
15:45 IST	Chidi Edeh 42', 60'	Report	Branco Cardozo 90'	Stadium: Ambedkar Stadium; Referee: Pratap Singh; Man of the Match: Chidi Edeh (Mahindra)

== Federation Cup ==
Mohun Bagan started the 2008 Federation Cup with a 2–1 win over Oil India FC. Although they lost against Vasco SC they finished the group stage with 2 wins and 1 loss, and qualified for the semi finals. In the semi Finals they won against their arch-rivals East Bengal in the penalty shoot-out after the game ended 1–1 in regulation time. In the finals, they defeated Dempo SC 1–0 with Barreto scoring the winner in the 68th min.

=== Group Stage ===
Team	Pld	W	D	L	GF	GA	GD	Pts
(India) Mohun Bagan	3	2	0	1	4	3	+1	6
(India) Vasco SC	3	2	0	1	2	1	+1	6
Air India FC	3	1	1	1	3	3	0	4
Oil India FC	3	0	1	2	2	4	−2	1

Source: 30th Federation Cup 2008

=== Matches ===
12 December 2008; 17:45 IST	Mohun Bagan	2–1	Oil India FC	Barasat Stadium
	Barreto 9', 57' (pen.)	Report	Durga Boro 36'; Jyotish Basumatari (yellow card) 57'; Zaidinmawia Hmar (yellow card) 61'; Mintu Boro (yellow card) 73'	Referee: A Arjunan; Man of the Match: Barreto (Mohun Bagan)

14 December 2008; 17:45 IST	Vasco SC	1–0	Mohun Bagan	Barasat Stadium
	Angelo D'Souza (yellow card) 28'; Angelo Colaco 79'	Report	James Lukram Singh (yellow card) 30'	Referee: Shaji Kurian

16 December 2008; 18:30 IST	Mohun Bagan	2–1	Air India	Barasat Stadium
	Lalkamal Bhowmick 53'; Marcos Pereira 60'	Report	Soccor Velho 27'; Ravinder Singh (yellow card) 80'; Chukwuma Udofia (yellow card) 90+1'	Referee: Pradeep Kumar; Man of the Match: Barreto (Mohun Bagan)

=== Semi Finals ===
18 December 2008 Semi-final	East Bengal	1–1 (a.e.t.) (3–5 p)	Mohun Bagan	Kolkata
18:30 IST	Sanju Pradhan 61'	Report	Jose Ramirez Barreto 65'	Stadium: Salt Lake Stadium; Referee: A. Arjunan
	Penalties
	Parveen Kumar (penalty scored); Hossain (penalty scored); Sen (penalty scored); Chhetri (penalty missed)		(penalty scored) Barreto; (penalty scored) Pereira; (penalty scored) Bhowmick; (penalty scored) Pachuau; (penalty scored) JL Singh

=== Final ===
21 December 2008	Dempo	0–1	Mohun Bagan	Salt Lake Stadium, Kolkata
16:15 IST		Report	Barreto 68'	Referee: T. Pradeep Kumar (Tamil Nadu)

== AFC Cup ==
Mohun Bagan qualified for the 2009 AFC Cup after winning the 2008 Federation Cup and were placed in Group D alongside Al-Kuwait of Kuwait, Al-Karamah of Syria and Al-Wehdat of Jordan. Mohun Bagan however, could not win any of the matches in the group stage as they finished last without any points and were eliminated.

=== Group stage ===
Team	Pld	W	D	L	GF	GA	GD	Pts	KUW	KAR	WAH	MOH
Al-Kuwait	6	4	1	1	12	4	+8	13		2–1	1–0	6–0
(Syria) Al-Karamah	6	4	0	2	12	7	+5	12	2–1		3–1	1–0
(Jordan) Al-Wahdat	6	3	1	2	12	7	+5	10	1–1	3–1		5–0
(India) Mohun Bagan	6	0	0	6	1	19	−18	0	0–1	0–4	1–2	

Legend: Blue = home team win; Yellow = draw; Red = away team win.

==== Matches ====
Win Draw Loss

10 March 2009 Group Stage	Al-Karamah (Syria)	1–0	(India) Mohun Bagan	Homs, Syria
	M. Al Hamawi 60'	(Summary)		Stadium: Khaled bin Walid Stadium; Attendance: 17,000; Referee: (Turkmenistan) Çarymyrat Gurbanow

17 March 2009 Group Stage	Mohun Bagan (India)	1–2	(Jordan) Al-Wahdat	Kolkata, India
	Rakesh Masih 13'	(Summary)	Mahmoud Shelbaieh 16'; Hassan Abdel Fattah 43'	Stadium: Salt Lake Stadium; Attendance: 10,000; Referee: (Malaysia) Wahab Abdul

7 April 2009 Group Stage	Mohun Bagan (India)	0–1	Al-Kuwait	Howrah, India
		(Summary)	Samer Al Martah 60'	Stadium: Howrah M.C.Stadium; Attendance: 8,000; Referee: (Hong Kong) Ng Chiu Kok

21 April 2009 Group Stage	Al-Kuwait	6–0	(India) Mohun Bagan	Kuwait City, Kuwait
	J. Al Hussain 9' (pen.), 21', 72'; Faraj Laheeb 34', 39'; Jarah Al Ataiqi 78'	(Summary)		Stadium: Al Kuwait SC Stadium; Attendance: 3,000; Referee: (Uzbekistan) Vladislav Tseytlin

5 May 2009 Group Stage	Al-Wahdat (Jordan)	5–0	(India) Mohun Bagan	Amman, Jordan
	Manju 27' (o.g.); Issa Al-Sabah 29', 40'; Hassan Abdel Fattah 67' (pen.); Ra'fat Ali 85'	(Summary)		Stadium: King Abdullah Stadium; Attendance: 4,000; Referee: (Lebanon) Mohammad Mansour

19 May 2009 Group Stage	Mohun Bagan (India)	0–4	(Syria) Al-Karamah	Howrah, India
		(Summary)	H. Al Taiar 17', 72'; A. Al Shbli 39'; M. Al Hamawi 60'	Stadium: Howrah M.C.Stadium; Attendance: 3,200; Referee: (Sri Lanka) Hettikamkanamge Perera

== Super Cup ==
2008 Federation Cup Champion Mohun Bagan faced 2008-09 I-League Champion Churchill Brothers in the 2009 Super Cup. Source:

=== Fixtures & results ===
Win Draw Loss

26 April 2009; 17:00 IST Final	Churchill Brothers	1–2	Mohun Bagan	Haryana
	Deepak Mondal 45+2' (o.g.)	Report	N. S. Manju 21', (yellow card) 70'; Barreto 88'	Stadium: Ch. Devi Lal Sports Complex; Referee: S Suresh

== Statistics ==
Sl No.	Name	Nat	CFL	I-League	Federation Cup	AFC Cup	Super Cup	Total
1	José Barreto	(Brazil)	7	10	4	0	1	22
2	Lalawmpuia Pachuau	(India)	8	3	0	0	0	11
3	Bhaichung Bhutia	(India)	0	6	0	0	0	6
4	Manju	(India)	1	3	0	0	1	5
5	Shylo Malsawmtluanga	(India)	4	0	0	0	0	4
6	Branco Cardozo	(India)	1	2	0	0	0	3
7	Habibur Rehman Mondal	(India)	2	0	0	0	0	2
7	Ishfaq Ahmed	(India)	0	2	0	0	0	2
7	Lalkamal Bhowmick	(India)	0	1	1	0	0	2
7	Rakesh Masih	(India)	0	1	0	1	0	2
8	James Lukram Singh	(India)	0	1	0	0	0	1
8	Marcos Pereira	(Brazil)	0	0	1	0	0	1
8	Peter Odafe	(Nigeria)	1	0	0	0	0	1
Own Goal(s)			0	1	0	0	0	1
Total			24	30	6	1	2	63

== See also ==
- 2009-10 Mohun Bagan FC season
- 2010-11 Mohun Bagan FC season
- Mohun Bagan Super Giant
