= 2008–09 East Bengal FC season =

Indian football club season

East Bengal
2008–09 season
- President: Dr Pranab Dasgupta
- Head-Coach: (India) Monoranjan Bhattacharya (until 15 September 2008) (India) Stanley Rozario (until 24 December 2008) (India) Subhash Bhowmick (from 24 December 2008)
- Ground: Salt Lake Stadium; Barasat Stadium; East Bengal Ground
- I-League: 6th
- Calcutta Football League: 3rd
- Federation Cup: Semi-finals
- Top goalscorer: League: Yusif Yakubu (11); All: Sunil Chhetri (13)
Home colours	Away colours

The 2008–09 season was East Bengal's 2nd season in the I-League and 89th season in existence.

== Competitions ==
=== Overall ===
Competition	First match	Last match	Final position
Calcutta Football League	14 July 2008	12 September 2008	3rd
I-League	26 September 2008	16 April 2009	6th
Federation Cup	11 December 2008	18 December 2008	Semi-finals

=== Overview ===
Competition	Record							
Competition	Pld	W	D	L	GF	GA	GD	Win %
Calcutta Football League	14	7	4	3	21	12	+9	50.00
I-League	22	7	7	8	31	26	+5	31.82
Federation Cup	4	3	1	0	5	1	+4	75.00
Total	40	17	12	11	57	39	+18	42.50

Last updated: 1 June 2009
Source: Competitions

=== Calcutta Football League ===
East Bengal finished the 2008 Calcutta Premier Division in 3rd place with 25 points from 14 matches behind champions Mohun Bagan and runners-up Mohammedan Sporting.

==== Fixtures & results ====
Win Draw Loss

14 July 2008 1	East Bengal	2–0	Calcutta Port Trust	Kolkata
	Mehtab Hussain 9'; Kima 73'	Report		Stadium: Barasat Stadium; Referee: Rathin Mukherjee; Man of the Match: Jayanta Sen (East Bengal)

17 July 2008 2	East Bengal	1–1	George Telegraph	Kolkata
	Alvito D'Cunha 52'	Report	Francis Chibueze Maduako 65'	Stadium: Barasat Stadium; Referee: Dhanapati Roy; Man of the Match: Francis Chibueze Maduako (George Telegraph)

20 July 2008 3	East Bengal	1–3	Mohammedan Sporting	Kolkata
	Khelemba Singh 75'	Report	Theodore Sunday Wrobeh 1', 85'; Mike Okoro 90+2' (pen.)	Stadium: Salt Lake Stadium; Referee: Minangshu Bhattacharya; Man of the Match: Theodore Sunday Wrobeh (Mohammedan Sporting)

24 July 2008 4	East Bengal	1–1	Railway FC	Kolkata
	Parveen Kumar 16'	Report	Suraj Mandal 33'	Stadium: Salt Lake Stadium; Referee: Kashinath Sen; Man of the Match: Suraj Mandal (Railway FC)

29 July 2008 5	East Bengal	1–0	Chirag United	Kolkata
	Ashim Biswas 49'	Report		Stadium: Barasat Stadium; Referee: Dilip Ghosh; Man of the Match: Ashim Biswas (East Bengal)

1 August 2008 6	East Bengal	3–1	Peerless	Kolkata
	Ashim Biswas 22'; Parveen Kumar 28', 67'	Report	Uzozle Emmanuel Junior 45+3'	Stadium: Barasat Stadium; Referee: Debashish Mishra; Man of the Match: Parveen Kumar (East Bengal)

5 August 2008 7	Mohun Bagan	2–1	East Bengal	Kolkata
	Lalawmpuia Pachuau 72', 82'	Report	Alvito D'Cunha 19'	Stadium: Salt Lake Stadium; Referee: Minangshu Bhattacharya; Man of the Match: Lalawmpuia Pachuau (Mohun Bagan)

11 August 2008 8	Calcuta Port Trust	0–0	East Bengal	Kolkata
		Report		Stadium: Barasat Stadium; Referee: Barun Saha; Man of the Match: Simanta Das (Calcuta Port Trust)

14 August 2008 9	George Telegraph	1–2	East Bengal	Kolkata
	Freebone Ipekere 90'	Report	Saumik Dey 32'; Suley Musah 53' (pen.)	Stadium: Salt Lake Stadium; Referee: Kashinath Sen; Man of the Match: Abhra Mondal (East Bengal)

25 August 2008 10	Mohammedan Sporting	0–2	East Bengal	Kolkata
		Report	Nirmal Chettri 23'; Ashim Biswas 27'	Stadium: Salt Lake Stadium; Referee: Rathin Mukherjee; Man of the Match: Ashim Biswas (East Bengal)

30 August 2008 11	Railway FC	0–3	East Bengal	Kolkata
		Report	Mehrajuddin Wadoo 78'; Edmilson Marques Pardal 82'; Sunil Chhetri 85'	Stadium: Salt Lake Stadium; Referee: Debashish Mukherjee; Man of the Match: Sanju Pradhan (East Bengal)

5 September 2008 12	Chirag United	1–0	East Bengal	Kolkata
	Lalmalswama Hmar 8'	Report		Stadium: Salt Lake Stadium; Referee: Rathin Mukherjee; Man of the Match: Lalmalswama Hmar (Chirag United)

8 September 2008 13	Peerless	1–3	East Bengal	Kolkata
	Uzozle Emmanuel Junior 77' (pen.)	Report	Sunil Chhetri 2'; Parveen Kumar 53'; Alvito D'Cunha 60'	Stadium: Salt Lake Stadium; Referee: Tushar Kanti Guha; Man of the Match: Surkumar Singh (East Bengal)

12 September 2008 14	East Bengal	1–1	Mohun Bagan	Kolkata
	Edmilson Marques Pardal 84'	Report	Jose Ramirez Barreto 25' (pen.)	Stadium: Salt Lake Stadium; Referee: Minangshu Bhattacharya; Man of the Match: Rakesh Masih (Mohun Bagan)

=== I League ===
==== League table ====
Pos	Team	Pld	W	D	L	GF	GA	GD	Pts	Qualification or relegation
4	Dempo	22	8	7	7	35	26	+9	31	
5	Mahindra United	22	8	7	7	28	22	+6	31	
6	East Bengal	22	7	7	8	31	26	+5	28	2010 AFC Cup group stage (Note: East Bengal qualified for the 2010 AFC Cup as 2009–10 Indian Federation Cup winners.)
7	Mumbai	22	7	7	8	22	27	−5	28	
8	Chirag United	22	6	8	8	20	26	−6	26	

Source: Soccerway
Rules for classification: 1) points; 2) goal difference; 3) number of goals scored.

==== Fixtures & results ====
Win Draw Loss

26 September 2008 1	East Bengal	3–1	Chirag United	Kolkata
18:30 IST	Surkumar Singh 10'; Yusif Yakubu 19'; Sunil Chhetri 28'	Report	Shankar Oraon 79'	Stadium: Barasat Stadium; Referee: S. Suresh; Man of the Match: Sunil Chhetri (East Bengal)

30 September 2008 2	East Bengal	0–1	Mumbai	Kolkata
18:30 IST		Report	Felix Aboagye 23'	Stadium: Barasat Stadium; Referee: A. Arjunan; Man of the Match: Selwyn Fernandes (Mumbai)

12 October 2008 3	Air India	2–0	East Bengal	Mumbai
15:30 IST	Surojit Roy 48'; Michael Tayo 79'	Report		Stadium: Cooperage Ground; Referee: O.P. Thakur; Man of the Match: Michael Tayo (Air India)

18 October 2008 4	East Bengal	2–0	Vasco	Kolkata
18:00 IST	Yusif Yakubu 7', 90'	Report		Stadium: Salt Lake Stadium; Referee: P.K. Bose; Man of the Match: Yusif Yakubu (East Bengal)

25 October 2008 5^{(KD)}	Mohun Bagan	1–1	East Bengal	Kolkata
17:00 IST	Bhaichung Bhutia 2'	Report	Syed Rahim Nabi 39'; Surkumar Singh (red card) 49'	Stadium: Salt Lake Stadium; Referee: Pradeep Kumar; Man of the Match: Ishfaq Ahmed (Mohun Bagan)

2 November 2008 6	Mohammedan Sporting	0–0	East Bengal	Kolkata
17:00 IST		Report		Stadium: Salt Lake Stadium; Referee: P.K. Bose; Man of the Match: Tharangachan Tungshang (Mohammedan Sporting)

7 November 2008 7	East Bengal	1–1	Mahindra United	Kolkata
17:00 IST	Sunil Chhetri 61'	Report	Paresh Shivalkar 58'	Stadium: Salt Lake Stadium; Referee: P. Bhaskar; Man of the Match: Dharmaraj Ravanan (Mahindra United)

15 November 2008 8	East Bengal	3–1	Sporting Club de Goa	Kolkata
17:00 IST	Sunil Chhetri 14'; Syed Rahim Nabi 27', 32'	Report	Harmanjot Khabra 54'	Stadium: Salt Lake Stadium; Referee: A. Arjunan; Man of the Match: Syed Rahim Nabi (East Bengal)

22 November 2008 9	JCT	1–0	East Bengal	Ludhiana
14:30 IST	Eduardo da Silva Escobar 68' (pen.)	Report		Stadium: Guru Nanak Stadium; Referee: Dinesh Nair; Man of the Match: Jaspal Parmar (JCT)

26 November 2008 10	Dempo	1–0	East Bengal	Margao
16:00 IST	Climax Lawrence 79'	Report		Stadium: Fatorda Stadium; Referee: P. Bhaskar; Man of the Match: Climax Lawrence (Dempo)

1 December 2008 11	East Bengal	1–2	Churchill Brothers	Kolkata
15:30 IST	Chitrasen Chandam 2' (o.g.)	Report	Ogba Kalu 32'; Mehrajuddin Wadoo 61' (o.g.)	Stadium: Salt Lake Stadium; Referee: S. Suresh; Man of the Match: Ogba Kalu (Churchill Brothers)

24 January 2009 12	Chirag United	0–0	East Bengal	Kolkata
14:45 IST		Report		Stadium: Salt Lake Stadium; Referee: P.K. Bose; Man of the Match: Somnath Khara (Chirag United)

24 January 2009 13	Mumbai	2–1	East Bengal	Mumbai
15:30 IST	Abhishek Yadav 47'; Abel Hammond 88'	Report	Yusif Yakubu 13' (pen.)	Stadium: Cooperage Ground; Referee: A. Rowan; Man of the Match: Abel Hammond (Mumbai)

7 February 2008 14	East Bengal	3–1	Air India	Kolkata
15:00 IST	Yusif Yakubu 49'; Sunil Chhetri 56'; Sanju Pradhan 81'	Report	Subhash Singh 88'	Stadium: Salt Lake Stadium; Referee: Dinesh Nair; Man of the Match: Sanju Pradhan (East Bengal)

14 February 2008 15	Vasco	1–4	East Bengal	Margao
16:15 IST	Sherzod Nazarov 52'	Report	Sunil Chhetri 28', 90'; Yusif Yakubu 46', 56'	Stadium: Fatorda Stadium; Referee: Pratap Singh; Man of the Match: Yusif Yakubu (East Bengal)

22 February 2008 16^{(KD)}	East Bengal	3–0	Mohun Bagan	Kolkata
18:30 IST	Syed Rahim Nabi 22', 40'; Sunil Chhetri 47'	Report		Stadium: Salt Lake Stadium; Referee: Dinesh Nair; Man of the Match: Syed Rahim Nabi (East Bengal)

28 February 2008 17	East Bengal	2–2	Mohammedan Sporting	Kolkata
18:30 IST	Nirmal Chettri 49'; Sunil Chhetri 54'	Report	Mike Okoro 4'; Eugene Gray 30'	Stadium: Salt Lake Stadium; Referee: Shaji Kurian; Man of the Match: Sunil Chhetri (East Bengal)

6 March 2008 18	Mahindra United	2–1	East Bengal	Mumbai
16:00 IST	Chidi Edeh 54' (pen.), 70' (pen.)	Report	Sunil Chhetri 50'	Stadium: Cooperage Ground; Referee: A. Arjunan; Man of the Match: Chidi Edeh (Mahindra United)

15 March 2008 19	Sporting Club de Goa	1–1	East Bengal	Margao
16:15 IST	Joseph Pereira 64'	Report	Ishmael Addo 42'	Stadium: Fatorda Stadium; Man of the Match: Joseph Pereira (Sporting Club de Goa)

22 March 2008 20	Churchill Brothers	3–1	East Bengal	Margao
16:15 IST	Odafa Onyeka Okolie 33', 74'; Ogba Kalu 47'	Report	Yusif Yakubu 90+1'	Stadium: Fatorda Stadium; Referee: P. Bhaskar; Man of the Match: Odafa Onyeka Okolie (Churchill Brothers)

3 April 2008 21	East Bengal	2–1	JCT	Kolkata
18:30 IST	Yusif Yakubu 35', 69'	Report	Eduardo da Silva Escobar 76'	Stadium: Barasat Stadium; Referee: O.P. Thakur; Man of the Match: Yusif Yakubu (East Bengal)

16 April 2008 22	East Bengal	2–2	Dempo	Kolkata
15:45 IST	Yusif Yakubu 12'; Ishmael Addo 60'	Report	Creson Antao 21'; Beto 22'	Stadium: Barasat Stadium; Referee: P.K. Bose; Man of the Match: Yusif Yakubu (East Bengal)

=== Federation Cup ===
East Bengal started the Federation Cup campaign as defending champions and was allotted into Group C alongside JCT, New Delhi Heroes and Sporting Club de Goa. East Bengal won all the group matches and reached the semi-finals where they lost to their arch-rivals Mohun Bagan in the penalty shoot-out after the game ended 1–1 in regulation time.

Group C

Team	Pld	W	D	L	GF	GA	GD	Pts
(India) East Bengal	3	3	0	0	4	0	+4	9
(India) JCT	3	2	0	1	3	1	+2	6
(India) New Delhi Heroes	3	1	0	2	1	3	−2	3
(India) Sporting Club de Goa	3	0	0	3	0	4	−4	0

Source: 30th Federation Cup 2008

==== Fixtures & results ====
Win Draw Loss

11 December 2008 QF Group Stage	East Bengal	2–0	New Delhi Heroes	Kolkata
17:45 IST	Sunil Chhetri 46'; Alvito D'Cunha 83'	Report	Santosh Singh (yellow card) 72' (yellow-red card) 90+2'	Stadium: Barasat Stadium; Referee: Shaji Kurian

13 December 2008 QF Group Stage	East Bengal	1–0	JCT	Kolkata
17:45 IST	Sunil Chhetri 47'	Report		Stadium: Barasat Stadium; Referee: T. Pradip Kumar

15 December 2008 QF Group Stage	East Bengal	1–0	Sporting Club de Goa	Kolkata
17:45 IST	Sanju Pradhan 79'	Report		Stadium: Barasat Stadium; Referee: A. Arjunan

18 December 2008^{(KD)} Semi-final	East Bengal	1–1 (a.e.t.) (3–5 p)	Mohun Bagan	Kolkata
18:30 IST	Sanju Pradhan 61'	Report	Jose Ramirez Barreto 65'	Stadium: Salt Lake Stadium; Referee: A. Arjunan
	Penalties
	Parveen Kumar (penalty scored); Hossain (penalty scored); Sen (penalty scored); Chhetri (penalty missed)		(penalty scored) Barreto; (penalty scored) Pereira; (penalty scored) Bhowmick; (penalty scored) Pachuau; (penalty scored) JL Singh

== Statistics ==
=== Appearances ===
Players with no appearances are not included in the list.

Appearances for East Bengal in 2008–09 season
No.	Pos.	Nat.	Name	CFL		I League		Fed Cup		Total	
No.	Pos.	Nat.	Name	Apps	Starts	Apps	Starts	Apps	Starts	Apps	Starts
Goalkeepers
24	GK	(India)	Subrata Paul	4	4	13	13	1	1	18	18
1	GK	(India)	Abhra Mondal	6	6	9	8	3	3	18	17
21	GK	(India)	Avijit Ghosh	0	0	1	1	0	0	1	1
31	GK	(India)	Arnab Das Sharma	4	4					4	4
Defenders
19	DF	(India)	Syed Rahim Nabi	4	4	22	22	3	2	29	28
26	DF	(India)	Mehrajuddin Wadoo	4	4	21	20	4	4	29	28
3	DF	(India)	Nirmal Chettri	10	8	19	17	4	4	33	29
29	DF	(India)	Saumik Dey	10	10	18	18	4	4	32	32
22	DF	(Ghana)	Suley Musah	9	8	14	14	3	3	26	25
27	DF	(India)	Surkumar Singh	3	3	13	13	0	0	16	16
2	DF	(India)	Muttah Suresh	6	6	9	8	0	0	15	14
5	DF	(India)	Khelemba Singh	9	8	3	2	0	0	12	10
17	DF	(India)	Jeevan Singh	4	3	1	0			5	3
20	DF	(India)	Poibang Pohshna	4	4			2	1	6	5
16	DF	(India)	Saheb Ali Mondal	1	0					1	0
33	DF	(India)	Saikat Saha Roy	5	3					5	3
12	DF	(India)	Anupam Sarkar	7	7					7	7
Midfielders
7	MF	(India)	Jayanta Sen	10	9	20	14	4	4	34	27
14	MF	(India)	Mehtab Hossain	9	9	17	13	4	4	30	26
22	MF	(India)	Sanju Pradhan	7	7	17	6	4	3	28	16
8	MF	(India)	Renedy Singh	2	2	16	15	2	2	20	19
9	MF	(India)	Alvito D'Cunha	11	7	10	2	4	0	25	9
18	MF	(Ghana)	Ishmael Addo			10	8			10	8
28	MF	(India)	Malsawmkima	13	9	9	4	2	1	24	14
6	MF	(India)	Dipankar Roy	6	2	2	0			8	2
15	MF	(India)	Dharamjit Singh	2	1	1	0			3	1
23	MF	(India)	Mumtaz Akhtar	1	0			1	0	2	0
Forwards
12	FW	(Ghana)	Yusif Yakubu			21	21	4	4	25	25
11	FW	(India)	Sunil Chhetri	5	5	17	17	4	4	26	26
25	FW	(India)	Parveen Kumar	12	3	8	3	3	0	23	6
10	FW	(India)	Ashim Biswas	13	13	5	1			18	14
30	FW	(Brazil)	Edmilson Marques Pardal	7	3	2	2			9	5
32	FW	(India)	Goutam Kujur	5	3	3	0			8	3

=== Goal scorers ===
Goals for East Bengal in 2008–09 season
Rank	No.	Pos.	Nat.	Name	CFL	I League	Fed Cup	Total
1	11	FW	(India)	Sunil Chhetri	2	9	2	13
2	12	FW	(Ghana)	Yusif Yakubu		11	0	11
3	19	DF	(India)	Syed Rahim Nabi	0	5	0	5
4	9	MF	(India)	Alvito D'Cunha	3	0	1	4
4	25	FW	(India)	Parveen Kumar	4	0	0	4
6	10	FW	(India)	Ashim Biswas	3	0		3
6	22	MF	(India)	Sanju Pradhan	0	1	2	3
8	3	DF	(India)	Nirmal Chettri	1	1	0	2
8	18	MF	(Ghana)	Ishmael Addo		2		2
8	30	FW	(Brazil)	Edmilson Marques Pardal	2	0		2
11	5	DF	(India)	Khelemba Singh	1	0	0	1
11	14	MF	(India)	Mehtab Hossain	1	0	0	1
11	22	DF	(Ghana)	Suley Musah	1	0	0	1
11	26	DF	(India)	Mehrajuddin Wadoo	1	0	0	1
11	27	DF	(India)	Surkumar Singh	0	1	0	1
11	28	MF	(India)	Malsawmkima	1	0	0	1
11	29	DF	(India)	Saumik Dey	1	0	0	1
Own goals					0	1	0	1
Total					21	31	5	57
