= 2007–08 Mohun Bagan FC season =

Indian football club season

Mohun Bagan
2007–08 season
- Head coach: Carlos Roberto Pereira
- Stadium: Salt Lake Stadium; Mohun Bagan Ground
- I-League: 4th
- Calcutta Football League: Champions
- Federation Cup: Semi Finals
- IFA Shield: Semi Finals

The 2007–08 Mohun Bagan Football Club season was the club's 1st season in I-League and 118th season since its establishment in 1889.

== Overview ==
=== Overall ===
Competition	First match	Last match	Final position
Calcutta Football League	1 August 2007	18 November 2007	Champions
Federation Cup	6 September 2007	11 September 2007	Semi Finals
I-League	26 November 2007	23 February 2008	4th
IFA Shield	27 February 2008	5 March 2008	Semi Finals

=== Overview ===
Competition	Record							
Competition	Pld	W	D	L	GF	GA	GD	Win %
Calcutta Football League	14	11	3	0	39	12	+27	78.57
Federation Cup	3	2	0	1	7	5	+2	66.67
I-League	18	8	6	4	22	17	+5	44.44
IFA Shield	4	2	0	2	8	6	+2	50.00
Total	39	23	9	7	76	40	+36	58.97

Last updated: 5 March 2008
Source: Competitions

== Calcutta Football League ==
Mohun Bagan won the Calcutta Football League for the 27th Time, with 36 points in 14 games, winning 11, drawing 3, and losing none in the process.

1 August 2007 1	Mohun Bagan	1–1	George Telegraph SC	Kolkata
14:30 IST	James Lukram Singh 72'	Report	Salau Olawale 18'	Stadium: Mohun Bagan Ground; Referee: Dhanapati Roy

5 August 2007 2	Chirag United	3–4	Mohun Bagan	Kolkata
14:30 IST	Theodore Sunday Wrobeh 21' (pen.); Shankar Oraon 41'; Ashim Das Sr 89' (pen.)	Report	Shanmugam Venkatesh 14'; Pachau Lalam Puia 60'; Jose Barreto 69'; Peter Siddiqui 75'	Stadium: Mohun Bagan Ground; Referee: Kashinath Sen

8 August 2007 3	Mohun Bagan	7–0	Calcutta Port Trust	Kolkata
14:30 IST	Jose Barreto 27', 42'; Lalkamal Bhowmick 37'; Pachau Lalam Puia 46'; Dharamjit Singh 60'; Shanmugam Venkatesh 62'; Prashanta Sarkar 75' (o.g.)	Report		Stadium: Mohun Bagan Ground; Referee: Rathin Mukherjee

11 August 2007 4	Mohun Bagan	3–0	Eastern Railway	Kolkata
14:30 IST	Jose Barreto 5', 31'; Shanmugam Venkatesh 27'	Report		Stadium: Mohun Bagan Ground; Referee: Jayanta Sarkar

17 August 2007 5	East Bengal	3–4	Mohun Bagan	Kolkata
	Alvito D'Cunha 46', 60'; Edmilson Marques Pardal 69' (pen.)	Report	Lalawmpuia Pachuau 9'; Jose Ramirez Barreto 34' (pen.); Shanmugam Venkatesh 42', 47'	Stadium: Salt Lake Stadium; Referee: Subrata Sarkar

21 August 2007 6	Peerless SC	2–3	Mohun Bagan	Kolkata
14:30 IST	Muritala Ali 63'; Kartick Kisku 70'	Report	Peter Siddiqui 26'; Jose Barreto 44' (pen.); Shanmugam Venkatesh 88'	Stadium: Mohun Bagan Ground; Referee: Rathin Mukherjee

26 August 2007 7	Mohun Bagan	0–0	Mohammedan SC	Kolkata
14:30 IST		Report		Stadium: Salt Lake Stadium; Referee: Benjamin

26 September 2007 8	George Telegraph SC	0–3	Mohun Bagan	Kolkata
14:30 IST		Report	Sanjay Mallick 29'; Jose Barreto 52', 89'	Stadium: Mohun Bagan Ground

2 October 2007 9	Mohun Bagan	3–0	Chirag United	Kolkata
14:30 IST	Jose Barreto 23', 35'; Pachau Lalam Puia 64'	Report		Stadium: Mohun Bagan Ground; Referee: Debasish Mishra

5 October 2007 10	Calcutta Port Trust	3–3	Mohun Bagan	Kolkata
14:30 IST	Henry Chukwukere 10', 90+'; Dipak Dalui 77'	Report	Pachau Lalam Puia 37', 39'; Jose Barreto 66' (pen.)	Stadium: Mohun Bagan Ground; Referee: Barun Saha

11 August 2007 11	Eastern Railway	0–3	Mohun Bagan	Kolkata
14:30 IST		Report	Douglas da Silva 37'; Shanmugam Venkatesh 44'; Ayan Chowdhury 86'	Stadium: Mohun Bagan Ground

6 November 2007 12	Mohun Bagan	2–0	East Bengal	Kolkata
	Jose Ramirez Barreto 49', 90+2'	Report		Stadium: Salt Lake Stadium; Referee: S Suresh

14 November 2007 13	Mohun Bagan	2–0	Peerless SC	Kolkata
14:30 IST	Lalawmpuia Pachuau 32'; Bhaichung Bhutia 66'	Report		Stadium: Mohun Bagan Ground; Referee: Minangshu Bhattacharya

18 November 2007 14	Mohammedan SC	0–1	Mohun Bagan	Kolkata
14:30 IST		Report	Lalawmpuia Pachuau 88'	Stadium: Salt Lake Stadium; Referee: Pradip Mukherjee

== Federation Cup ==
Defending Champions Mohun Bagan started the 2007 Federation Cup campaign with a 2–1 win against debutants ONGC in the Pre-Quarter Finals. Bagan went ahead through an own goal by Gulidum Rongmoi in the 32nd minute before José Ramirez Barreto settled the matter in the 107th minute. Jatin Singh Bisht scored for ONGC in the 83rd minute.
In the Quarter-Finals, Mohun Bagan were in full flow as they outclassed Viva Kerala FC 3–1. For Bagan, Jose Ramirez Barreto, substitute Ishfaq Ahmed and Lalawmpuia Pachau were the scorers, while P Sajesh was the lone goal getter for Viva Kerala.
In the Semi-Final, Mohun Bagan faced arch-rivals East Bengal. Bhaichung Bhutia put Mohun Bagan ahead in the 12th minute but East Bengal rallied from behind to score three. Surkumar Singh equalised in the 25th minute while Dipendu Biswas and Ashim Biswas scored the other two. José Ramirez Barreto's goal in the 71st minute wasn't enough for Bagan as East Bengal won 3–2 to reach the final.

=== Bracket ===
Pre-Quarter Finals
4 September
JCT	3
Vasco	1
4 September
Mohammedan Sporting	1
East Bengal	3
6 September
Air India	1
Viva Kerala	2
6 September
ONGC	1
Mohun Bagan	2
7 September
Dempo	3
Chirag United	0
7 September
Salgaocar	1
Churchill Brothers	4
5 September
Mahindra United	1
HAL	0
5 September
Army XI	0
Sporting Clube de Goa	1

Quarter-Finals
9 September
JCT	2
East Bengal	3
9 September
Viva Kerala	1
Mohun Bagan	3
10 September
Dempo	2
Churchill Brothers	0
8 September
Mahindra United	1 (5)
Sporting Clube de Goa	1 (4)

Semi-Finals
11 September
East Bengal	3
Mohun Bagan	2
12 September
Dempo	1 (1)
Mahindra United	1 (3)

Final
5 September
East Bengal	2
Mahindra United	1

=== Matches ===
6 September 2007 Pre-Quarter Final	ONGC	1–2 (a.e.t.)	Mohun Bagan	Ludhiana
	Jatin Singh Bisht 82'	Report	Gulidom Rongboi 31' (o.g.); Jose Ramirez Barreto 107'	Stadium: Guru Nanak Stadium; Referee: Deepak Singh Bisht

9 September 2007 Quarter-Final	Viva Kerala FC	1–3	Mohun Bagan	Ludhiana
	P Sajesh 51'	Report	Jose Ramirez Barreto 16'; Ishfaq Ahmed 40'; Lalawmpuia Pachuau 55'	Stadium: Guru Nanak Stadium; Referee: Francisco Fernandes

11 September 2007 Semi-Final	East Bengal	3–2	Mohun Bagan	Ludhiana
	Irungbam Surkumar Singh 25'; Dipendu Biswas 35'; Ashim Biswas 47'	Report	Bhaichung Bhutia 12'; Jose Ramirez Barreto 71'	Stadium: Guru Nanak Stadium; Referee: K. Shankar

== I-League ==
=== League table ===
Pos	Team	Pld	W	D	L	GF	GA	GD	Pts	Qualification or relegation
2	Churchill Brothers	18	11	3	4	40	22	+18	36	
3	JCT	18	9	6	3	31	14	+17	33	
4	Mohun Bagan	18	8	6	4	22	17	+5	30	2009 AFC Cup group stage (Note: Mohun Bagan qualified for the 2009 AFC Cup as 2008 Indian Federation Cup winners.)
5	Mahindra United	18	7	7	4	24	18	+6	28	
6	East Bengal	18	5	4	9	17	23	−6	19	

Source: Soccerway
Rules for classification: 1) points; 2) goal difference; 3) number of goals scored.

=== Results summary ===
Overall								Home						Away					
Pld	W	D	L	GF	GA	GD	Pts	W	D	L	GF	GA	GD	W	D	L	GF	GA	GD
18	8	6	4	22	17	+5	30	5	2	2	10	7	+3	3	4	2	12	10	+2

Last updated: 1 April 2008.
Source: Flashscore

=== Results by round ===
Round	1	2	3	4	5	6	7	8	9	10	11	12	13	14	15	16	17	18
Ground	H	H	H	H	A	A	A	H	H	A	A	A	A	H				
Result	L	L	D	W	L	D	W	W	W	L	W	W	D	W	W	D	D	D

Source: Flashscore
A = Away; H = Home; W = Win; D = Draw; L = Loss

==== Fixtures & results ====
Win Draw Loss

26 November 2007 1	Mohun Bagan	1-2	JCT	Kolkata
16:30 IST	Shanmugam Venkatesh 90+2'	Report	Eduardo da Silva Escobar (yellow card) 4', (goal) 13', 77'	Stadium: Salt Lake Stadium; Referee: S Suresh; Man of the Match: Eduardo da Silva Escobar (JCT FC)

29 November 2007 2	Mohun Bagan	1-3	Viva Kerala FC	Kolkata
16:30 IST	James Lukram Singh (yellow card) 36'; Ishfaq Ahmed 68'	Report	Badmus Baba Thunde 16'; Wisdom Abbey 25', 88'	Stadium: Salt Lake Stadium; Referee: Francisco Fernandes; Man of the Match: Wisdom Abbey (Viva Kerala)

2 December 2007 3	Mohun Bagan	1-1	Sporting Club de Goa	Kolkata
17:30 IST	Jose Barreto 47'	Report	Junior Obagbemiro 56'	Stadium: Salt Lake Stadium; Referee: T Pradeep Kumar; Man of the Match: Jose Barreto (Mohun Bagan)

8 December 2007 4	Mohun Bagan	2-0	Air India	Kolkata
17:30 IST	Bhaichung Bhutia 21', 84'; Lalawmpuia Pachuau (yellow card) 33'	Report		Stadium: Salt Lake Stadium; Referee: P Bhaskar; Man of the Match: Bhaichung Bhutia (Mohun Bagan)

12 December 2007 5	Dempo SC	2-0	Mohun Bagan	Goa
15:30 IST	Nicolau Borges 14', 73'; Chidi Edeh (yellow card) 40'	Report	Peter Siddiqui (yellow card) 6'; Ishfaq Ahmed (yellow card) 54'	Stadium: Jawaharlal Nehru Stadium (Margao); Referee: Ahmed Amees; Man of the Match: Nicolau Borges (Dempo)

16 December 2007 6	Churchill Brothers	2-2	Mohun Bagan	Goa
15:30 IST	Odafa (yellow card) 29', (goal) 67'; Mboyo Iyumi 71'	Report	Nallappan Mohanraj (yellow card) 35' (yellow-red card) 52'; Dharamjit Singh 47'; Bhaichung Bhutia 70'	Stadium: Jawaharlal Nehru Stadium (Margao); Referee: Ahmed Amees; Man of the Match: Mboyo Iyumi (Churchill Brothers)

22 December 2007 7	Salgaocar FC	4-5	Mohun Bagan	Goa
15:30 IST	Boniface Ambani 13'; Felix Chimaokwu 22', 53', 63', (yellow card) 48'	Report	Bhaichung Bhutia 3'; Rauf Khan (yellow card) 21'; Lal Kamal Bhowmick (yellow card) 29'; Jose Barreto 32', 35'; Jonathan Bobo 45'; James Lukram Singh 69'	Stadium: Jawaharlal Nehru Stadium (Margao); Referee: Dinesh Nair; Man of the Match: Felix Chimaokwu (Salgaocar FC)

30 December 2007 8	Mohun Bagan	1–0	East Bengal	Kolkata
16:00 IST	Baichung Bhutia (yellow card) 10', (goal) 61'; Douglas da Silva (yellow card) 13'; Habibur Rehman Mondal (yellow card) 20'; Pachuau Lalawmpuia (yellow card) 87'	Report	Mehtab Hossain (yellow card) 6'; Edmilson (yellow card) 9'; Mehrajuddin Wadoo (yellow card) 23'	Stadium: Salt Lake Stadium; Referee: Komaleeswaran Shankar; Man of the Match: Douglas da Silva (Mohun Bagan)

5 January 2008 9	Mohun Bagan	1–0	Mahindra United	Kolkata
17:00 IST	N.S. Manju (yellow card) 50'; Jose Barreto 66'; Douglas da Silva (yellow card) 67'	Report	Md Rafi (yellow card) 25'	Stadium: Salt Lake Stadium; Referee: A Arjunan; Man of the Match: Peter Odafe (Mohun Bagan)

9 January 2008 10	Sporting Club de Goa	1-0	Mohun Bagan	Goa
15:30 IST	Denzil Franco (yellow card) 18'; Junior Obagbemiro 85'	Report	Nallappan Mohanraj (yellow card) 28'	Stadium: Jawaharlal Nehru Stadium (Margao); Referee: T Pradeep Kumar; Man of the Match: Joseph Pereira (Sporting Club de Goa)

13 January 2008 11	Viva Kerala	0–2	Mohun Bagan	Kozhikode
16:00 IST		Report	Bhaichung Bhutia 36'; Peter Odafe (yellow card) 65'; Ishfaq Ahmed 88'	Stadium: EMS Stadium; Referee: P Bhaskar; Man of the Match: Douglas da Silva (Mohun Bagan)

21 January 2008 12	East Bengal	0–2	Mohun Bagan	Kolkata
16:00 IST	Saumik Dey (yellow card) 3'	Report	Bhaichung Bhutia 29', 62'; Douglas da Silva (yellow card) 9' (yellow-red card) 48'; Sangram Mukherjee (yellow card) 84'	Stadium: Salt Lake Stadium; Referee: Dinesh Nair; Man of the Match: Bhaichung Bhutia (Mohun Bagan)

27 January 2008 13	Air India	0–0	Mohun Bagan	Mumbai
15:30 IST		Report		Stadium: Cooperage Ground; Referee: Benjamin D'Silva; Man of the Match: Michael Segum Taeo (Air India)

31 January 2008 14	Mohun Bagan	2-1	Churchill Brothers	Kolkata
18:00 IST	Bhaichung Bhutia 4'; Subhashish Roy Chowdhury (yellow card) 7'; Habibur Rehman Mondal 31'; Nallappan Mohanraj (yellow card) 55'	Report	Mboyo Iyumi 38'	Stadium: Salt Lake Stadium; Referee: S Suresh; Man of the Match: Habibur Rehman Mondal (Mohun Bagan)

== Statistics ==
2025–26 Mohun Bagan SG Youth and Academy
