= 2008–09 I-League =

2nd season of the I-League

- Season: 2008–09 I-League Season
- Dates: 26 September 2008– 16 April 2009
- Champions: Churchill Brothers; 1st I-League title 1st Indian title
- Relegated: Mohammedan; Vasco
- AFC Champions League: Churchill Brothers
- AFC Cup: East Bengal (as Federation Cup Winners)
- Matches: 132
- Goals: 318 (2.41 per match)
- Top goalscorer: Odafa Onyeka Okolie

The 2008–09 I-League season began on 26 September 2008 and finished on 16 April 2009 with a break in December for the Federation Cup and Durand Cup. Most games this season were played on Saturday's and Sunday's to attract larger crowds. After a successful first season for the I League, the second season featured 12 teams from four cities – again this would be expanded in the 2009–10 season to 14 teams.

The champion in the I-League qualified for the AFC Champions League 2010 qualifying playoffs in 2010, while the bottom two teams were relegated to I-League 2nd Division for the next season.

== Gallery ==
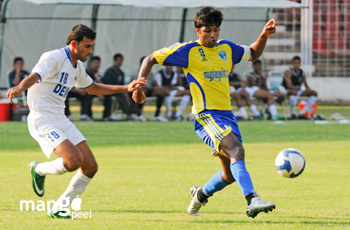
Abhishek Yadav of Mumbai FC and Samir Naik of Dempo during I-League match at Fatorda Stadium Goa

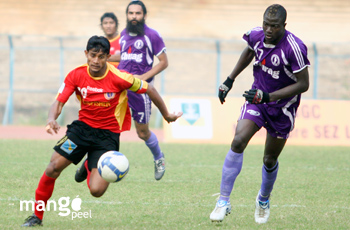
Sayed Rahim Nabi of East Bengal and Daniel of Chirag United during a 2008–09 I-League at Salt Lake Stadium

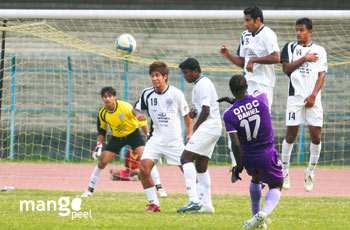
I League Daniel of Chirag United takes a freekick against Mahindra United at Salt Lake Stadium in Kolkata

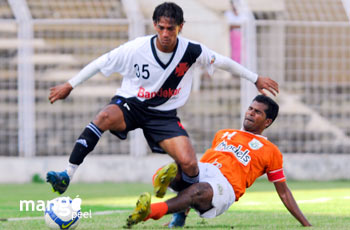
Wilton Gomes of Sporting Clube de Goa tackles Lester Fernandes of Vasco during I-League 2008-09 match at Fatorda Stadium Goa

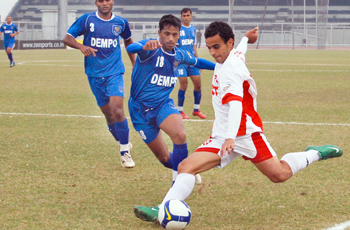
Baljit Saini of JCT against Dempo during I-League 2008–09 at Guru Nanak Stadium Ludhiana

== Teams ==
Locations of games played in the 2008–09 I-League

Club	Manager	Location	Stadia
Air India	(India) Bimal Ghosh	Mumbai	Cooperage Ground
Churchill Brothers	(Morocco) Karim Bencherifa	Goa	Jawaharlal Nehru – Fatorda Stadium
Dempo	(India) Armando Colaco	Goa	Jawaharlal Nehru – Fatorda Stadium
East Bengal	(India) Monoranjan Bhattacharya	Kolkata	Salt Lake Stadium
JCT	(India) Sukhwinder Singh	New Delhi	Ambedkar Stadium
Mahindra United	(India) Derrick Pereira	Mumbai	Cooperage Ground
Mohammedan Sporting	(India) Shabbir Ali	Kolkata	Salt Lake Stadium
Mohun Bagan	(Brazil) Carlos Roberto Pereira Da Silva	Kolkata	Salt Lake Stadium
Sporting Goa	(Nigeria) Clifford Chukwuma	Goa	Jawaharlal Nehru – Fatorda Stadium
Vasco	(India) Subrata Bhattacharya	Goa	Jawaharlal Nehru – Fatorda Stadium

== League table ==
Pos	Team	Pld	W	D	L	GF	GA	GD	Pts	Qualification or relegation
1	Churchill Brothers	22	13	7	2	53	23	+30	46	2010 AFC Champions League Qualifying play-off
2	Mohun Bagan	22	13	4	5	30	20	+10	43	
3	Sporting Goa	22	13	4	5	28	20	+8	43	
4	Dempo	22	8	7	7	35	26	+9	31	
5	Mahindra United	22	8	7	7	28	22	+6	31	
6	East Bengal	22	7	7	8	31	26	+5	28	2010 AFC Cup group stage (Note: East Bengal qualified for the 2010 AFC Cup as 2009–10 Indian Federation Cup winners.)
7	Mumbai	22	7	7	8	22	27	−5	28	
8	Chirag United	22	6	8	8	20	26	−6	26	
9	JCT	22	6	7	9	19	22	−3	25	
10	Air India	22	5	9	8	21	26	−5	24	
11	Mohammedan Sporting	22	5	7	10	17	31	−14	22	Relegation to 2010 I-League 2nd Division
12	Vasco (R)	22	2	4	16	14	49	−35	10	Relegation to 2010 I-League 2nd Division

Source: Soccerway
Rules for classification: 1) points; 2) goal difference; 3) number of goals scored.
(R) Relegated

=== Home and away season ===
==== Round 1 ====
26 September 2008
18:30 IST

East Bengal	3–1	Chirag United Sports Club
I Surkumar Singh 10'; Yakubu 19'; Sunil Chhetri 28'		Shankar Oraon 79'

Barasat Stadium
Referee: S Suresh

26 September 2008
16:00 IST

Vasco Sports Club	0–1	Sporting Clube de Goa
		Elijah Obagbemiro Jr 90+1'

Jawaharlal Nehru – Fatorda Stadium
Referee: Minangshu Bhattacharya

27 September 2008
18:30 IST

Mohun Bagan	1–2	Mumbai FC
Pachau Lalam Puia 77'		Abel Hammond 9'; Kalia Kulothungan 24'

Barasat Stadium
Referee: A Arjunan

27 September 2008
16:00 IST

Churchill Brothers	2–1	Mahindra United
Odafe Onyeka Okolie 61' 88'		Sushil Kumar Singh 83'

Jawaharlal Nehru – Fatorda Stadium
Referee: Pratap Singh

28 September 2008
16:00 IST

Dempo Sports Club	1–2	JCT FC
Nicolau Borges 77'		Escobar 17'; Balwant Singh 64'

Jawaharlal Nehru – Fatorda Stadium
Referee: Pradeep Kumar

29 September 2008
18:30 IST

Mohammedan Sporting Club	1–1	Air-India
Theodore Sunday Wrobeh 59'		Surojit Roy 23'

Barasat Stadium
Referee: Francisco Fernandes

==== Round 2 ====
30 September 2008
18:30 IST

East Bengal	0–1	Mumbai FC
		Felix Aboagye 23'

Salt Lake Stadium
Referee: A Arjunan

2 October 2008
16:00 IST

Vasco Sports Club	0–0	JCT FC

Jawaharlal Nehru – Fatorda Stadium

3 October 2008
18:30 IST

Mohun Bagan	1–1	Air-India
Branco Cordozo 70'		Soccor Velho 43'

Salt Lake Stadium

4 October 2008
16:00 IST

Sporting Clube de Goa	3–0	Mohammedan Sporting Club
Elijah Obagbemiro Jr 63' 77'; Micky Fernandes 76'

Jawaharlal Nehru – Fatorda Stadium
Referee: Dinesh Nair

4 October 2008
16:00 IST

Mahindra United	1–3	Chirag United Sports Club
Sushil Kumar Singh 12'		Subair Muritala Ali 46'; Gouranga Datta 52'; Hardip Singh Saini 87'

Cooperage Ground

5 November 2008

Churchill Brothers	3–3	Dempo Sports Club
Felix Chimaokwu 15' 19'; Odafe Onyeka Okolie 31'		Mboyo Iyomi 37' 47' 76'

Jawaharlal Nehru – Fatorda Stadium

==== Round 3 ====
11 October 2008
16:00 IST

JCT FC	2–0	Mohammedan Sporting Club
Saini 46'; Escobar 68'

Guru Nanak Dev Stadium

11 October 2008

Mahindra United	0–1	Mumbai FC
		Kalia Kulothungan 23'

Cooperage Ground
Referee: Benjamin Silva

11 October 2008
16:00 IST

Sporting Clube de Goa	2–0	Mohun Bagan
Wilton Gomes 26'; Nathaniel Amos 51'	Report

Jawaharlal Nehru – Fatorda Stadium
Referee: P Bhaskar

12 October 2008
18:30 IST

Chirag United Sports Club	0–0	Churchill Brothers

Salt Lake Stadium

12 October 2008
18:30 IST

Air-India	2–0	East Bengal
Surojit Roy 48' Michael Tayo 70'

Cooperage Ground

12 October 2008
16:00 IST

Dempo Sports Club	2–1	Vasco Sports Club
Roberto Silva 24' Ranty Martins 30'		Ravshan Teshabaev 32'

Jawaharlal Nehru – Fatorda Stadium

==== Round 4 ====
11 November 2008

Mumbai FC	0–0	Dempo SC

Cooperage Ground

18 October 2008
16:00 IST

JCT FC	0–1	Mahindra United
		Sukhwinder Singh 70'

Guru Nanak Dev Stadium
Referee: Nazir Ahmed

18 October 2008
18:30 IST

Air-India	1–0	Chirag United Sports Club
Surojit Roy 69'

Cooperage Ground
Referee: A Rowan

18 October 2008
18:30 IST

East Bengal	2–0	Vasco Sports Club
Yakubu 7', 90'

Salt Lake Stadium
Referee: PK Bose

19 October 2008
18:30 IST

Mohammedan Sporting Club	1–1	Mohun Bagan
Goutam Thakur 3'		Jose Ramirez Barreto 23'

Salt Lake Stadium
Referee: Sreenivasan Suresh

19 October 2008
16:00 IST

Churchill Brothers	3–0	Sporting Clube de Goa
Odafe Onyeka Okolie 14', 60'; Thokchom Naoba Singh 85'

Jawaharlal Nehru – Fatorda Stadium
Referee: Pradeep Kumar

==== Round 5 ====
23 October 2008

Chirag United Sports Club	0–0	JCT FC

Salt Lake Stadium

24 October 2008

Mohammedan Sporting Club	1–0	Mahindra United
Mike Okoro 75'

Salt Lake Stadium

24 October 2008

Sporting Clube de Goa	1–0	Mumbai FC
Eliga Junior 17'

Jawaharlal Nehru – Fatorda Stadium

25 October 2008

Mohun Bagan	1–1	East Bengal
Baichung Bhutia 2'		Rahim Nabi 38'

Salt Lake Stadium

25 October 2008

Vasco Sports Club	1–4	Churchill Brothers
Agnelo Colaco 70'		Odafe Onyeka Okolie 39' 44' 62' Felix Chimaokw 41'

Jawaharlal Nehru – Fatorda Stadium

26 October 2008

Dempo SC	3–1	Air-India
Ranty Martins 38' 78' Climax Lawrence 55'		Ravinder Singh 60'

Jawaharlal Nehru – Fatorda Stadium

==== Round 6 ====
31 October 2008

Dempo SC	0–1	Mohun Bagan
		Jose Ramirez Barreto (P) 52'

Jawaharlal Nehru – Fatorda Stadium

1 November 2008

Chirag United Sports Club	0–1	Sporting Clube de Goa
		Joseph Pereira 73'

Salt Lake Stadium

1 November 2008

Air-India	2–0	Mumbai FC
Soccor Velho 20 20' Subhas Singh 32'

Cooperage Ground

1 November 2008

Vasco Sports Club	0–2	Mahindra United
		Chiddi Edeh 43' Sushil Kumar Singh 61'

Jawaharlal Nehru – Fatorda Stadium

2 November 2008

Mohammedan Sporting Club	0–0	East Bengal

Salt Lake Stadium

2 November 2008

Churchill Brothers	1–1	JCT FC
Odafe Onyeka Okolie 27'		Amandeep Singh 48'

Jawaharlal Nehru – Fatorda Stadium

==== Round 7 ====
7 November 2008

East Bengal	1–1	Mahindra United
Chhetri 61'		Paresh Shivalkar 59'

Salt Lake Stadium

8 November 2008

Mumbai FC	1–1	Vasco Sports Club
Kulothungan 25'		Abhiskek Yadav 65'

Cooperage Ground

8 November 2008

Dempo SC	0–1	Sporting Clube de Goa
		Elija Jr. 83'

Jawaharlal Nehru – Fatorda Stadium

8 November 2008

Chirag United Sports Club	1–0	Mohammedan Sporting Club
Gouranga Dutta 62'

Salt Lake Stadium

9 November 2008

Mohun Bagan	1–0	Churchill Brothers
P Lalwampuia 14'

Salt Lake Stadium

9 November 2008

Air-India	1–0	JCT FC
Samson Singh 86'

Cooperage Ground

==== Round 8 ====
14 November 2008

Mohammedan Sporting Club	1–0	Vasco Sports Club
Bimal Parier 87'

Salt Lake Stadium

14 November 2008

Mahindra United	1–1	Air-India
Sushil Kumar 55'		Subhash Singh 66'

Cooperage Ground

15 November 2008

East Bengal	3–1	Sporting Clube de Goa
Chhetri 14' Syed Rahim Nabi 26' 31'		Harmanjot Khabra 54'

Salt Lake Stadium

15 November 2008

Churchill Brothers	2–2	Mumbai FC
Odafe Onyeka Okolie 21' Reisangmi Vashum 70'		Abhishek Yadav 10' Kulothungan 75'

Jawaharlal Nehru – Fatorda Stadium

16 November 2008

Mohun Bagan	2–0	JCT FC
Ishfaq Ahmed 15' Jose Ramirez Barreto 30' (pen.)

Salt Lake Stadium

16 November 2008

Dempo SC	4–0	Chirag United Sports Club
Ranty Martins 4' 70' Joaquim Abranches 45+1' Roberto Mendes Silva 58'

Jawaharlal Nehru – Fatorda Stadium

==== Round 9 ====
18 November 2008
16:00 IST

Churchill Brothers	1–1	Air-India
Felix Chimaokwu 38'		Michael Tayo 90+3'

Jawaharlal Nehru – Fatorda Stadium

19 October 2008
18:30 IST

Mahindra United	0–0	Sporting Clube de Goa

Cooperage Ground

20 November 2008

Mohammedan Sporting Club	0–2	Dempo Sports Club
		Anthony Pereira 9' Ranti Martins 41'

Salt Lake Stadium

20 November 2008

Vasco Sports Club	1–2	Mohun Bagan
Lalnun Puia 29'		Rakesh Masih 31' Lalkamal Bhowmick 55'

Jawaharlal Nehru – Fatorda Stadium

21 November 2008

Chirag United Sports Club	1–1	Mumbai FC
Shankar Orao 12'		Riston Rodrigues 59'

Salt Lake Stadium

22 November 2008
16:00 IST

JCT FC	1–0	East Bengal
Escobar 58'

Guru Nanak Dev Stadium

==== Round 10 ====
23 November 2008

Mohammedan Sporting Club	0–1	Churchill Brothers
		Okolie 70'

Salt Lake Stadium

24 November 2008

Mohun Bagan AC	1–0	Mahindra United
Bhaichung Bhutia 46'

Salt Lake Stadium
Referee: P. Basu

25 November 2008

Chirag United Sports Club	3–1	Vasco Sports Club

Salt Lake Stadium

26 November 2008

Dempo Sports Club	1–0	East Bengal
[Beto] 78'

Goa

26 November 2008

JCT FC	2–3	Mumbai FC

Cooperage Ground

==== Round 12 ====
23 January 2009

Mumbai FC	0–3	Mohun Bagan AC

Cooperage Ground, Mumbai

23 January 2009

JCT FC	2–1	Dempo Sports Club

Guru Nanak Dev Stadium

24 January 2009

Chirag United Sports Club	0–0	East Bengal

Saltlake Stadium, Kolkata

24 January 2009

Mahindra United	1–3	Churchill Brothers SC

Cooperage Ground, Mumbai

25 January 2009

Air-India	1–1	Mohammedan Sporting Club

Cooperage Ground, Mumbai

25 January 2009

Sporting Clube de Goa	0–1	Vasco Sports Club

Fatorda Stadium, Margao

==== Round 13 ====
31 January 2009

Mohammedan Sporting Club	0–1	Sporting Clube de Goa

31 January 2009

JCT FC	1–1	Vasco Sports Club

31 January 2009

Mumbai FC	2–1	East Bengal
A. Yadav 47'; A. Hammond 88'		Yakubu 13'

1 February 2009

Chirag United Sports Club	0–2	Mahindra United

1 February 2009

Air-India	1–2	Mohun Bagan AC

1 February 2009

Dempo Sports Club	1–1	Churchill Brothers SC

==== Round 14 ====
6 February 2009

Mohun Bagan AC	1–0	Sporting Clube de Goa

6 February 2009

Mumbai FC	0–0	Mahindra United

7 February 2009

Mohammedan Sporting Club	2–0	JCT FC

7 February 2009

Churchill Brothers SC	3–0	Chirag United Sports Club

7 February 2009

East Bengal	3–1	Air-India
Yakubu 49'; Sunil Chhetri 56'; Sanju Pradhan 81'		Subhash Singh 88'

8 February 2009

Vasco Sports Club	2–2	Dempo Sports Club

==== Round 15 ====
13 February 2009

Dempo Sports Club	3–0	Mumbai FC

14 February 2009

Vasco Sports Club	1–4	East Bengal
Sherzod Nazarov 52'		Chhetri 29' 90', Yakubu 46', 56'

14 February 2009

Chirag United Sports Club	1–0	Air-India

14 February 2009

Mahindra United	0–0	JCT FC

15 February 2009
18:30 IST

Mohun Bagan AC	1–0	Mohammedan Sporting Club
James Lukram Singh 14'

Salt Lake Stadium
Referee: Pradeep Kumar

15 February 2009

Sporting Clube de Goa	1–0	Churchill Brothers SC

==== Round 16 ====
20 February 2009

Air-India	0–0	Dempo Sports Club

20 February 2009

Churchill Brothers SC	9 -1	Vasco Sports Club
Odafe Onyeka Okolie 42' 50' 57' 82' 89' 90'

21 February 2009

Mahindra United	0–0	Mohammedan Sporting Club

21 February 2009

JCT FC	0–1	Chirag United Sports Club
		Ayeni Bidemi Daniel 38'

22 February 2009

East Bengal	3–0	Mohun Bagan AC
Syed Rahim Nabi 22', 40'; Chhetri 47'

Salt Lake Stadium
Attendance: 90,000

22 February 2009

Mumbai FC	1–2	Sporting Clube de Goa

==== Round 17 ====
26 February 2009

JCT FC	1–2	Churchill Brothers SC

27 February 2009

Sporting Clube de Goa	2–2	Chirag United Sports Club

28 February 2009

Mumbai FC	1–1	Air-India
Kalia Kulothungan 38'		Emmanuel Ovieghara

Cooperage, Mumbai

28 February 2009

East Bengal	2–2	Mohammedan Sporting Club
Nirmal Chhetri 48'; Chhetri 54'		Okoro 4'; Eugene Gray

Salt Lake Stadium, Kolkata
Referee: Shaji Kurian

1 March 2009

Mahindra United	4–0	Vasco Sports Club

12 April 2009

Mohun Bagan AC	2–1	Dempo SC

==== Round 18 ====
4 March 2009

Churchill Brothers SC	3–1	Mohun Bagan AC
Odafe Onyeka Okolie 45', Ogba Kalu Nnanna 57', 77'		Jose Ramirez Barreto 28'

Referee: Pradeep Kumar (Tamil Nadu)

5 March 2009

Sporting Clube de Goa	2–1	Dempo SC

6 March 2009

Mahindra United	2–1	East Bengal
C.Edeh 54' 70'		Sunil Chhetri 50'

7 March 2009

Mohammedan Sporting Club	2–2	Chirag United Sports Club

7 March 2009

JCT FC	1–1	Air-India

8 March 2009

Vasco Sports Club	1–2	Mumbai FC
		Kalia Kulothungan 89', Abhishek Yadav 10'

==== Round 19 ====
14 March 2009

Air-India	1–3	Mahindra United
		Sushil Kumar Singh 56'

14 March 2009

Vasco Sports Club	0–1	Mohammedan Sporting Club

15 March 2009

Sporting Clube de Goa	1–1	East Bengal
J. Pereira 64'		I. Addo 42'

15 March 2009

Mumbai FC	2–3	Churchill Brothers SC
Anees Kutty 15'

28 March 2009

JCT FC	1–1	Mohun Bagan AC

28 March 2009

Chirag United Sports Club	0–0	Dempo SC

==== Round 20 ====
21 March 2009

JCT FC	2–0	Sporting Clube de Goa
Paul M. Nwachukwu 11', Jagpreet singh 81'

22 March 2009

Mohammedan Sporting Club	2–0	Mumbai FC
Satyajit Bose 14'

22 March 2009

Churchill Brothers SC	3–1	East Bengal
Odafe Onyeka Okolie 45' 75'; Kalu 53'		Yakubu 86'

22 March 2009

Air-India	1–0	Vasco Sports Club
Singam Subash Singh 67'

23 March 2009

Dempo SC	3–2	Mahindra United
		Arata izumi 1', Sushil Kumar Singh 65'

23 March 2009

Chirag United Sports Club	1–2	Mohun Bagan AC

==== Round 21 ====
28 March 2009

Air-India	1–1	Churchill Brothers SC

28 March 2009

Sporting Clube de Goa	2–0	Mahindra United

1 April 2009

Mumbai FC	0–0	Chirag United Sports Club

2 April 2009

Dempo SC	4–1	Mohammedan Sporting Club

2 April 2009

Mohun Bagan AC	3–0	Vasco Sports Club

3 April 2009

East Bengal	2–1	JCT FC
Yakubu 35' 69'		Edu 76'

==== Round 22 ====
16 April 2009

Churchill Brothers	6–2	Mohammedan Sporting Club
Vashum 5'; Okolie 8', 84'; Chimaokwu 61'; Paite 63'; N. Singh 87'	Report	Okoro 52'; Jothikumar 90'

Nehru Stadium, Margao

16 April 2009

Air-India	1–3	Sporting Clube de Goa

16 April 2009

JCT FC	1–0	Mumbai FC

16 April 2009

East Bengal	2–2	Dempo SC
Yakubu 12'; I. Addo 60'		C. Antao 21'; Beto 22'

16 April 2009

Mahindra United	2–1	Mohun Bagan AC

16 April 2009

Vasco Sports Club	1–4	Chirag United Sports Club

== Top scorers ==
As of 23 March 2009

Rank	Scorer	Club	Goals
1	(Nigeria) Odafe Onyeka Okolie	Churchill Brothers	24
2	(Brazil) Jose Ramirez Barreto	Mohun Bagan	10
2	(Nigeria) Felix Chimaokwu	Churchill Brothers	10
4	(India) Sunil Chhetri	East Bengal	9
4	(Nigeria) Ranty Martins Soleye	Dempo	9
4	(Nigeria) Chidi Edeh	Mahindra United	9
4	(Ghana) Yusif Yakubu	East Bengal	9
8	(India) Singam Subash Singh	Air India	7
8	(India) Sushil Kumar Singh	Mahindra United	7
8	(India) Kalia Kulothungan	Mumbai	7
8	(Nigeria) Junior Obagbemiro	Sporting Goa	7
12	(India) Baichung Bhutia	Mohun Bagan	6
12	(Nigeria) Ogba Kalu Nnanna	Churchill Brothers	6
12	(India) Joseph Pereira	Sporting Goa	6
