= 2008 Indian Federation Cup =

30th edition of the Federation Cup

2008 Federation Cup
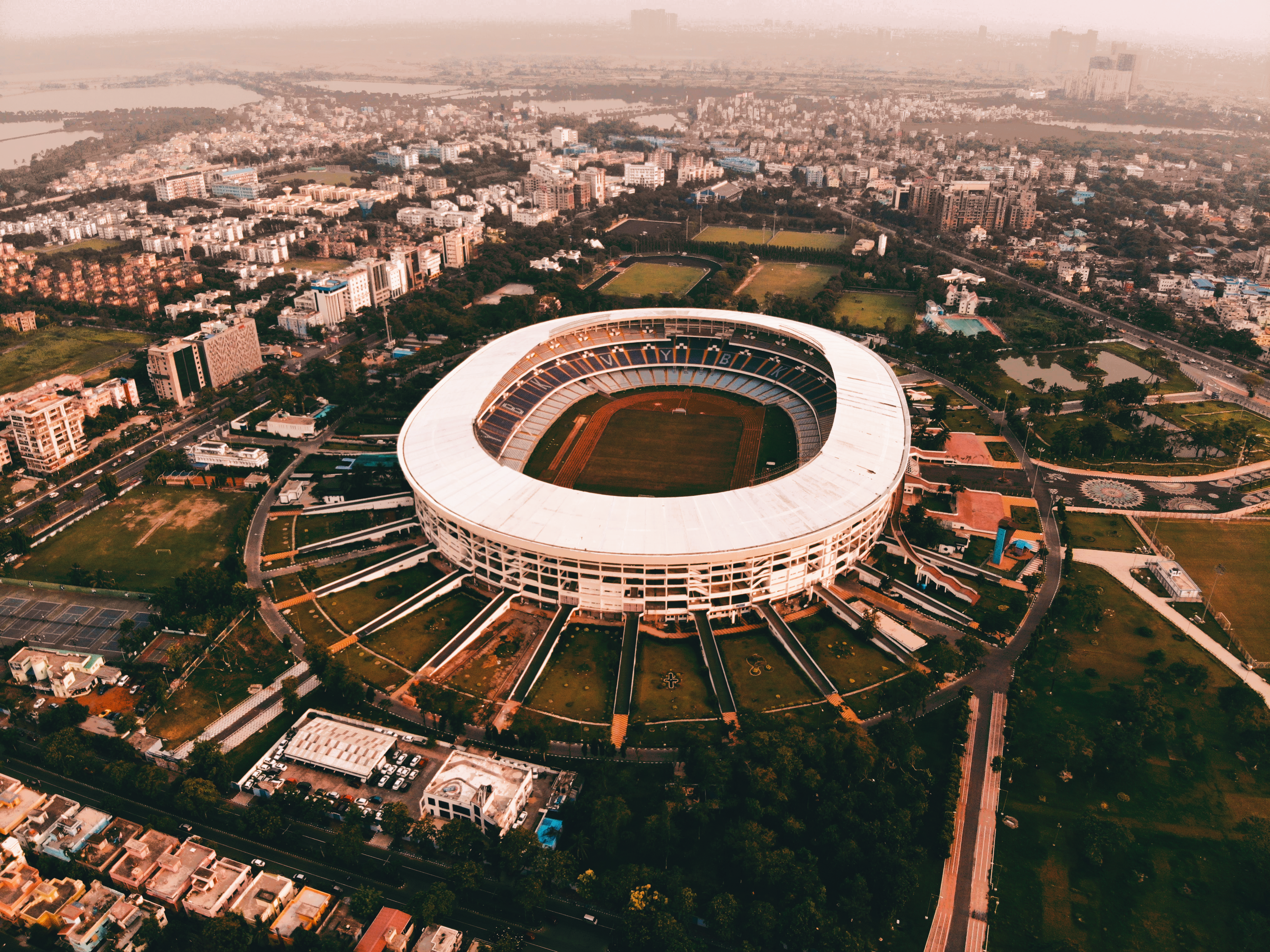
- Salt Lake Stadium hosted the final on 21 December 2008

Tournament details
- Country: India
- Dates: 4–21 December 2008
- Teams: 16

Final positions
- Champions: Mohun Bagan (13th title)
- Runners-up: Dempo
- AFC Cup: Mohun Bagan

The 2008 Indian Federation Cup was the 30th season of the Indian Federation Cup. It was held between 4 and 21 December 2008. The cup winner were guaranteed a place in the 2009 AFC Cup.

== Results ==
=== Semi-finals ===
Play was halted for eight minutes during the first semi-final after Dempo's Ranti Martins collided head-on with Churchill Brothers' Ogba Kalu Nnanna in the 73rd minute, after the two rose for a corner kick from the former's teammate Robert Lalthlamuana.

18 December 2008
15:15 IST

| Dempo | 2–0 | Churchill Brothers |
|---|---|---|
| Martins 13'; Miranda 58' | Report |

Salt Lake Stadium, Kolkata
Referee: Shaji Kurian (Kerala)

18 December 2008
18:30 IST

| East Bengal | 1–1 (a.e.t.) | Mohun Bagan |
|---|---|---|
| Pradhan 61' | Report | Barreto 65' |
Penalties
| Kumar (penalty scored); Hossain (penalty scored); Sen (penalty scored); Chhetri (penalty missed) | 3–5 | (penalty scored) Barreto; (penalty scored) Pereira; (penalty scored) Bhowmick; (penalty scored) Pachuau; (penalty scored) JL Singh |

Salt Lake Stadium, Kolkata

=== Final ===
21 December 2008
16:15 IST

| Dempo | 0–1 | Mohun Bagan |
|---|---|---|
| | Report | Barreto 68' |

Salt Lake Stadium, Kolkata
Referee: T. Pradeep Kumar (Tamil Nadu)
