= James Singh =

James Singh may refer to:

- James Singh Lukram (born 1981), Indian footballer
- James Shankar Singh (1924–2014), Fijian Indian farmer, businessman and politician
