= Shilton Paul =

Indian footballer (born 1988)

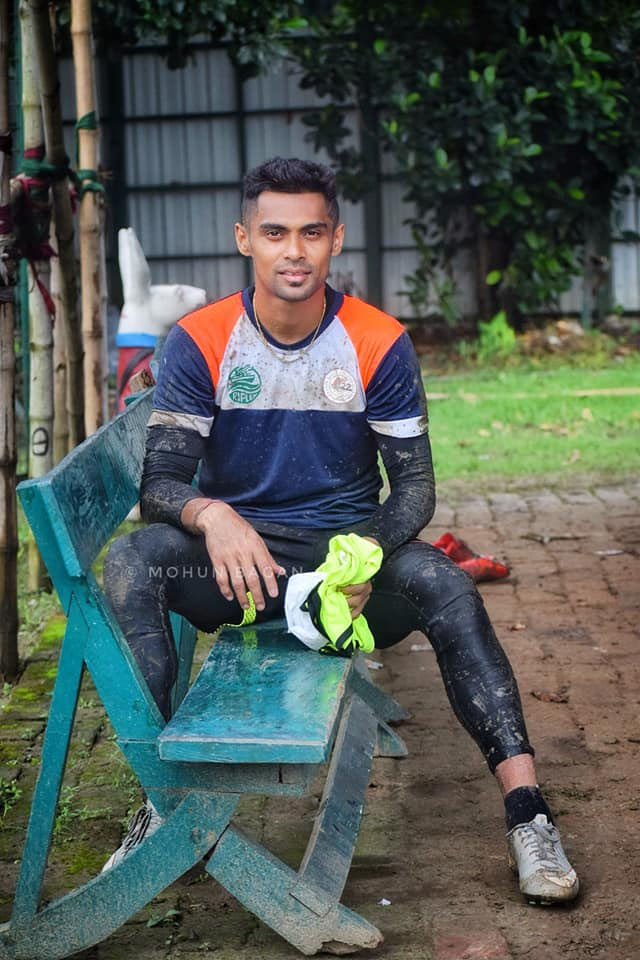
- Paul during a practice session in Mohun Bagan

Personal information
- Full name: Shilton Paul
- Date of birth: 10 June 1988 (age 38)
- Place of birth: Maslandapur, West Bengal
- Height: 1.74 m (5 ft 8 1/2 in)
- Position: Goalkeeper

Youth career
- 2000–2006: Tata Football Academy

Senior career*
Years	Team	Apps	(Gls)
2006–2020	Mohun Bagan	257	(0)
2014	→ Chennaiyin (loan)	4	(0)
2015	→ Kerala Blasters (loan)	0	(0)
2016	→ ATK (loan)	0	(0)
2020–2022	Churchill Brothers	23	(0)
2020	→ Bhawanipore (loan)	3	(0)
2024	ASOS Rainbow	11	(0)

International career
2006	India U-20	3	(0)
- * Club domestic league appearances and goals

Shilton Paul (Bengali: শিল্টন পাল; born 10 June 1988) is a retired Indian professional footballer who last played as a goalkeeper for Calcutta Football League club Asos Rainbow.

== Club career ==
=== Mohun Bagan AC ===
After graduating from Tata Football Academy, Paul signed with I-League club Mohun Bagan in 2006. He got to play his first match in an AFC Cup encounter]l. Since his debut, Shilton has been an integral part of the Mohun Bagan team every year. Although an excellent goalkeeper, he sometimes got to play the second fiddle when the likes of Sangram Mukherjee, Sandip Nandy and Debjit Majumder were present in the team. He was handed over the Captaincy of Mohun Bagan in 2014 and led his side to victory in the 2014-15 I-League campaign.

=== Chennaiyin FC ===
In 2014 he joined Chennaiyin on loan from Mohun Bagan in first Indian Super League season, he went on to play four matches in the irst season of Indian Super League.

=== Kerala Blasters FC ===
Shilton represented Kerala Blasters FC in ISL Season 2.

=== Atletico De Kolkata ===
Shilton represented Atletico De Kolkata in ISL season 3 and that year Atletico De Kolkata emerged as the eventual champions under coach José Francisco Molina for the second time in the history of the Indian Super League.

=== Bhawanipore FC ===
Shilton joined Calcutta Football League side Bhawanipore F.C. in September 2020. On 8 October, he captained the side on his debut and kept a cleansheet in a 2–0 win over FC Bengaluru United.

=== Churchill Brothers ===
After 14 seasons with Mohun Bagan, Paul joined Churchill Brothers in July 2020 for a one-year deal. He made his debut for Churchill Brothers in their 5–2 win over Indian Arrows in the 2020–21 edition of the I-League on 11 January 2021.

=== Rainbow AC ===
On 29 June 2023, Paul joined Calcutta Premier Division side Rainbow AC. He was ruled out of opening six matches due to an ankle injury. But finally on 7 August, he made his debut and first appearance after 15 months, when he captained Rainbow in a 2–1 win over West Bengal Police. After the match, he also expressed his disappointment with the ground his team was allotted to play.

== International ==
He made 3 appearances for India in the 2006 AFC Challenge Cup and was on the bench for qualifiers for the 2007 Asian Cup.

He represented India in the 22nd JRD Tata Cup at Jamshedpur in 2003.

He represented India in the AFC Youth Championship(U-16) at Japan in 2004.

He represented India in the 10th South Asian Games at Colombo, Sri Lanka in 2006.

He represented India in the AFC Youth Championship at Kolkata in 2006.

== Career statistics ==
=== Club ===
As of 1 September 2024

Club	Season	League			CFL		Cup		AFC		Other		Total	
Club	Season	Division	Apps	Goals	Apps	Goals	Apps	Goals	Apps	Goals	Apps	Goals	Apps	Goals
Mohun Bagan	2006–07	NFL	5	0	?	0	0	0	6 (Note: Appearance(s) in AFC Cup)	0	1 (Note: Appearance in Indian Super Cup)	0		0
Mohun Bagan	2007–08	I-League	6	0	?	0		0						0
Mohun Bagan	2008–09	I-League		0		0	0	0	2	0	1 (Note: Appearance in Indian Super Cup)	0		0
Mohun Bagan	2009–10	I-League		0		0	0	0	—		4 (Note: Appearance in IFA Shield)	0		0
Mohun Bagan	2010–11	I-League		0		0	5 (Note: Appearance(s) in Federation Cup)	0	—		0	0		0
Mohun Bagan	2011–12	I-League		0	3	0		0	—		—			0
Mohun Bagan	2012–13	I-League	19	0	7	0	1	0	—		3 (Note: 2 Appearances in IFA Shield and 1 Appearance in All Airlines Gold Cup)	0	30	0
Mohun Bagan	2013–14	I-League	13	0	10	0	4	0	—		1 (Note: Appearance in IFA Shield)	0	28	0
Mohun Bagan	2014–15	I-League	6	0	5	0	4	0	—		0	0	15	0
Mohun Bagan	2015–16	I-League	1	0	5	0	0	0	1	0	—		7	0
Mohun Bagan	2016–17	I-League	3	0	0	0	1	0	6	0	—		10	0
Mohun Bagan	2017–18	I-League	17	0	4	0	3 (Note: Appearance(s) in Super Cup)	0	—		0	0	24	0
Mohun Bagan	2018–19	I-League	11	0	5	0	—		—		—		16	0
Mohun Bagan	2019–20	I-League	0	0	3	0	1 (Note: Appearance(s) in Durand Cup)	0	—		0	0	4	0
Mohun Bagan	Total		60	0	28	0	14	0	7	0	4	0	123	0
Chennaiyin (loan)	2014	Indian Super League	4	0	—		—		—		—		4	0
Kerala Blasters (loan)	2015	Indian Super League	0	0	—		—		—		—		0	0
ATK (loan)	2016	Indian Super League	0	0	—		—		—		—		0	0
Churchill Brothers	2020–21	I-League	9	0	—		—		—		—		9	0
Churchill Brothers	2021–22	I-League	14	0	—		—		—		—		14	0
Churchill Brothers	Total		23	0	0	0	0	0	0	0	0	0	23	0
Bhawanipore (loan)	2020	I-League 2nd Division	3	0	0	0	—		—		—		3	0
Rainbow AC	2024	Calcutta Premier Division	—		11	0	—		—		—		11	0
Career total			100	0	5	0	7	0	112	12				

== Honours ==
=== Club ===
Mohun Bagan

- I-League (2): 2014–15, 2019–20
- Federation Cup (3): 2006, 2008, 2015–16
- Calcutta Football League (3): 2008, 2009, 2018
- Sikkim Governors Gold Cup (1): 2017

=== Atletico de Kolkata ===
- Indian Super League: 2016

=== Individual ===
- I-League Best Goalkeeper Award (1): 2017–18
- Mohun Bagan Player of the Year (1): 2018
- Sports Journalist Best Player Award (1): 2018
- Times Sports Man of the Year (1): 2019
