= Eugene Gray =

Liberian footballer (born 1974)

Personal information
- Full name: Eugene Jlah Gray
- Date of birth: 12 May 1974 (age 52)
- Place of birth: Liberia

Senior career*
Years	Team	Apps	(Gls)
- Junior Professional
1999–2001	Kochin		
2001–2002	Salgaocar		
2002–2003	Mohammedan		
2003–2006	EverReady		
2005–2006	Persitara North Jakarta		
2006	Persmin Minahasa		
2007	Persidago Gorontalo		
2009	Mohammedan		(3)
2009–2010	Muktijoddha Sangsad		

International career
1997–2002	Liberia	6	(0)
- * Club domestic league appearances and goals

Eugene Gray (born 12 May 1974 in Liberia) is a Liberian retired footballer.

== Career ==
In February 1996, he had an unsuccessful trial at Croatian side Hajduk Split.

Previously on the books of Persitara Jakarta Utara, Gray stated that football in Indonesia was more organized, elaborating that money is put into the sport there and that it was also advanced compared to India.

Taking the place of Theodore Sunday Wrobeh in time for Mohammedan's 25 January 2009 matchday at Air India, the Liberian's role was to get the Black and Whites out of the relegation zone, but they finished 11th out of 12th.

Despite putting Mohammedan 2–0 up over East Bengal, the game ended 2–2, after which the Liberia international claimed that they did not try to systematically hold on to their lead.
