= Branco Cardozo =

Indian footballer (born 1987)

Personal information
- Full name: Branco Vincent Cardozo
- Date of birth: 21 January 1987 (age 39)
- Place of birth: Goa, India
- Position: Midfielder

Youth career
- 2004: Sporting Goa
- 2004–2008: Tata FA

Senior career*
| Years | Team | Apps | (Gls) |
| 2008–2010 | Mohun Bagan | | |
| 2010–2011 | Chirag United | | |
| 2011–2012 | East Bengal | | |
| 2012–2013 | Air India | 5 | (1) |
| 2013–2014 | Mumbai | 1 | (0) |

International career
- India U23
- * Club domestic league appearances and goals

Branco Cardozo (born 21 January 1987) is an Indian former professional footballer who last played as a midfielder for Mumbai in the I-League.

== Career ==
=== Mohun Bagan ===
After spending his youth career with Tata Football Academy Cardozo signed for I-League side Mohun Bagan on 29 March 2008 on a two-year contract. On 3 October 2008 Cardozo scored his first career goal for Mohun Bagan against Air India FC at the Salt Lake Stadium which was also the equalizer for Mohun Bagan as it helped the club salvage a 1–1 draw. He then scored his second goal of the season on 16 April 2009 against Mahindra United which turned out to only be a consolation as Mohun Bagan suffered a 2–1 defeat.

Cardozo then began his second professional season with Mohun Bagan with a goal on 8 October 2009 against JCT Mills at the Salt Lake Stadium in which he found the net in the 84th minute as Mohun Bagan were still defeated 2–1. Cardozo then went on to score what would be his final goal for the club on 7 November 2009 against Sporting Goa in which he found the net in the 33rd minute to tie the score at 1–1 before the match officially ended 2–2.

=== Chirag United and East Bengal ===
For the 2010–11 I-League season Cardozo signed for Chirag United, however after a goal-less season in the I-League Cardozo left the club and signed for Kolkata rivals East Bengal for the 2011–12 season.

=== Air India ===
After one season with East Bengal Cardozo decided to sign with Air India FC who also play in the I-League for the 2012–13 I-League season. He then made his debut for the club on 7 April 2013 against Mumbai F.C. in which he came on as an 81st-minute substitute for Souvik Chakraborty as Air India lost 3–1. Then in the very next game on 13 April 2013 Cardozo managed to find the net for the first time in two years in the I-League when he scored against his former club Mohun Bagan in which he scored in the 94th minute to tie the match before Odafe Onyeka Okolie scored the winner a few minutes later as Air India lost the match 3–2.

=== Mumbai ===
He made his debut for Mumbai in the I-League on 6 October 2013 against Mohammedan S.C. at the Salt Lake Stadium; in which he came on as a substitute for Hashmatullah Barakzai in the 72nd minute; as Mumbai lost the match 1–0.
