= Ishfaq Ahmed =

Indian footballer and manager

Personal information
- Date of birth: 17 March 1983 (age 43)
- Place of birth: Srinagar, Jammu and Kashmir, India
- Height: 1.75 m (5 ft 9 in)
- Position: Central midfielder

Team information
- Current team: Real Kashmir

Senior career*
Years	Team	Apps	(Gls)
2002–2003	HAL	26	(4)
2003–2007	Dempo	62	(14)
2007–2011	Mohun Bagan	82	(12)
2011–2012	Salgaocar	30	(8)
2012–2013	East Bengal	22	(2)
2013–2014	→ Mohammedan (loan)	28	(4)
2014–2017	Kerala Blasters	25	(6)
2015-2016	→ Pune (loan)	25	(4)
2016-2017	→ Mumbai (loan)	26	(2)
2017-2019	→ Mohammedan (loan)	54	(4)
Total		380	(50)

International career
2004	India U23	4	(2)

Managerial career
- 2015–2017: Kerala Blasters (assistant)
- 2017–2018: Jamshedpur (assistant)
- 2019–2023: Kerala Blasters (assistant)
- 2021-2022: Kerala Blasters (interim)
- 2023–: Real Kashmir
- 2024–2025: India U17
- * Club domestic league appearances and goals

Ishfaq Ahmed (born 17 March 1983) is an Indian football coach and former footballer. He is currently serving as the head coach of the I-League club Real Kashmir and the India national under-17 football team.

He is also a member of the AIFF technical committee. He is considered as one of the most technical strikers in the Indian football. Ishfaq is one among the two professional footballers, along with Mehrajuddin Wadoo, to come from Jammu and Kashmir. He has represented the country and has played in the I-League and the Indian Super League for several clubs, including Dempo, Mohun Bagan, Salgaocar, East Bengal, Mohammedan, Kerala Blasters, Pune F.C, and Mumbai F.C. He has also won the league title while also winning domestic cups such as the Federation Cup and Durand Cup.

== Club career ==
=== Early career ===
Born in the Barbar Shah locality in Srinagar, Jammu and Kashmir, Ahmed started his sports career as a cricket player. Despite more opportunities to play cricket, Ahmed admitted that his first sporting love was football and he started to play the game at Biscoe School while also playing for the local side, YMCA. At the age of seventeen, Ahmed lead YMCA to the state league title, becoming the state top scorer in the process while playing as a striker. He credits his first football coach, Satpal Singh, for getting him to become a professional footballer: "Satpal Singh not only brushed up my skills but also helped me turn into a professional. My teachers at Biscoe and Gandhi College also supported me a lot." After playing for YMCA, Ahmed started to play for the Jammu and Kashmir Bank football team. After good performances with the side, Ahmed was selected to join the Jammu and Kashmir under-21 side for the Dutta Ray Trophy as captain.

Due to his performance during the Dutta Ray Trophy, Ahmed was awarded the best player of the tournament award. After the tournament, Ahmed signed with Hindustan Aeronautics Limited (HAL). During his only season at HAL, Ahmed scored seven goals in the National Football League, including strikes against major sides such as East Bengal, Dempo, and Churchill Brothers.

After one season with HAL, Ahmed signed with Dempo. He stayed with the club for four seasons, winning the National Football League title twice, a Federation Cup, and a Durand Cup. He began his career at Dempo as a striker but after head coach Armando Colaco signed Beto to play as striker, Ahmed was put onto the bench. After being knocked-out of the Federation Cup by Ahmed's old side HAL Colaco changed his tactics and put Beto in the midfield while pairing Ahmed with Nigerian player, Ranti Martins.

=== Mohun Bagan ===
After the 2006–07 season, Ahmed was offered a contract extension with Dempo but decided to think it over after a lack of playing time. Mohun Bagan secretary, Debasish Dutta, contacted Ahmed and offered him a contract with the Kolkata side. Ahmed was at first pensive about signing for Mohun Bagan since Kolkata clubs were known to pay their players late and overall bad management but after some consideration, Ahmed signed a one-year deal with Mohun Bagan. His first season at Mohun Bagan saw Ahmed play 37 matches and he played mainly as a left winger. He helped the side win the Federation Cup in 2008 and finished as runners up during the 2008–09 I-League season. He was also named as the best player during the Santosh Trophy in 2008.

During the 2010–11 season, Ahmed was named as Mohun Bagan captain, becoming the first Kashmiri captain in the club's history.

=== Later career ===
After four years with Mohun Bagan, Ahmed moved back to Goa to sign with I-League side Salgaocar. He helped the side win the Federation Cup in 2011 before moving to Mohun Bagan's Kolkata rivals, East Bengal. He was a regular fixture in the squad for East Bengal during the 2012–13 I-League season as East Bengal finished third.

After the season ended, Ahmed signed a contract with IMG–Reliance to be part of the Indian Super League. Despite signing the contract, Ahmed was left without an I-League side as the clubs agreed not to sign any players who joined the ISL, until Mohammedan, another Kolkata club, signed Ahmed on 30 October 2013.

In July 2014, Ahmed was selected by the Kerala Blasters during the Indian player draft for the Indian Super League. He made his debut for the side on 30 October 2014 against Pune City. He came on as a 25th-minute substitute for Ramandeep Singh as the Blasters won 2–1. Ahmed then went on to score the first goal for Kerala Blasters in leg 1 of the 2014 Indian Super League playoffs match-up against Chennaiyin. His 27th-minute strike was the first of a 3–0 rout of the Chennai side.

After the season ended, Ahmed joined Pune for the I-League campaign on loan before rejoining Kerala Blasters for 2015. For the 2015 season, Ahmed became a player-assistant coach for the Kerala Blasters. After the Indian Super League season, on 26 February 2016, it was announced that Ahmed would join another I-League side on loan, Mumbai for the 2015–16 season.

=== Mohammedan ===
on 26 May 2017, it was announced that Ahmed would join I-League 2nd Division side on loan, Mohammedan for next two season.

== International career ==
After good performances for Dempo, Ahmed was called up to the India U23 side by head coach, Stephen Constantine, for Olympic qualification. Ahmed scored on his debut for the side against Turkmenistan U23 as India won 1–0. In 2005 he was called for the national team for 2006 World Cup qualification matches but could not find place in first 11.

== Coaching career ==
He started his coaching career with Kerala Blasters as player cum assistant manager in 2015. After retirement from football, he joined Jamshedpur FC as their assistant coach under Steve Coppell, with whom he previously worked at Kerala Blasters. After Coppell's departure from Jamshedpur he also left the club. In 2019 Ishfaq returned to Kerala Blasters as their assistant coach under the newly appointed head coach Eelco Schattorie.

In 2020 he extended his contract with the Blasters for another 3 years. On 17 February 2021, Ishfaq took over as the interim head coach at the Blasters after the head coach Kibu Vicuna and the club decided to part away on mutual consent. He managed the club in the last two games of the season.

After the Blasters' 2022–23 season, the club announced that they have mutually parted ways with Ishfaq as their assistant coach.

In October 2023, he joined I-League club Real Kashmir as new head coach. On 28 October, in the 2023–24 season opener, his team earned a 2–0 victory over Rajasthan United.

== AlFF committee member ==
On 23 March 2017, Ishfaq was selected to the All India Football Federation's Technical Committee member.
