= N. S. Manju =

Indian footballer (born 1984)

Personal information
- Full name: Nanjangud Shivananju Manju
- Date of birth: 9 May 1984 (age 42)
- Place of birth: Mysore, Karnataka, India
- Position: Defender

Youth career
- DYS, Karnataka

Senior career*
Years	Team	Apps	(Gls)
2003–2004	HAL		
2004–2007	Mahindra United		
2007–2010	Mohun Bagan		
2011–2012	United Sikkim		
2012	→ Pune (loan)	0	(0)
2013–2016	Bengaluru FC	3	(0)

International career^{‡}
2004	India U20		
2006–2008	India U23		
2005–2011	India	25	(2)
- * Club domestic league appearances and goals as of 22 December 2013 ‡ National team caps and goals as of 4 October 2013

Nanjangud Shivananju Manju (born 9 May 1984) is an Indian professional footballer who played as a defender for Bengaluru FC in the I-League. He was capped 25 times for India. He is currently working as a Football Commentator in Star Sports 1 Kannada Channel for the Indian Super League.

== Career ==
=== Early career ===
In his early career, Manju played for Hindustan Aeronautics Limited S.C., Mahindra United, and Mohun Bagan A.C. all in the National Football League and I-League. Manju was nominated for the ‘Best Indian Player’ Award at the inaugural edition of the FPAI Awards Night in 2009.

=== United Sikkim ===
On 18 February 2011, it was announced that Manju had signed with United Sikkim F.C. of the I-League 2nd Division along with national team teammate Renedy Singh. The major decider in him going was that the team was owned by his national teammate Baichung Bhutia.

=== Pune FC (loan) ===
On 7 January 2012, it was confirmed that Manju had signed for I-League side Pune F.C. on loan for the remainder of the 2011–12 I-League season.

=== Bengaluru FC ===
After not playing at all during the 2012–13 I-League season, Manju signed for new direct-entry I-League club Bengaluru FC for the 2013–14 season. He made his debut for the club on 2 November 2013 against Mumbai F.C. at the Balewadi Sports Complex in which he played the full match as Bengaluru FC drew the match 2–2.

== International ==
After doing well in domestic league football, Manju earned a call-up to the India national football team. Before playing for the seniors, Manju was captain of the India U23 team. He was on the India national squad who won the prestigious Nehru Cup in 2007 and 2009.

He was on the squad that toured Barcelona as a preparatory camp for the Nehru Cup 2009, but unfortunately got himself injured in the first match of the Nehru Cup 2009 vs Lebanon which ruled him out of the Nehru Cup 2009, IFA Shield, Durand Cup as well as Federation Cup.

=== International goals ===
Scores and results list India's goal tally first.

No	Date	Venue	Opponent	Score	Result	Competition
1.	14 December 2005	Peoples Football Stadium, Karachi, Pakistan	Maldives	1–0	1–0	2005 South Asian Football Federation Gold Cup
2.	6 September 2006	Prince Abdullah Al Faisal Stadium, Jeddah, Saudi Arabia	Saudi Arabia	1–0	1–7	2007 AFC Asian Cup qualification

== Honours ==
India

- SAFF Championship: 2005; runner-up: 2008
- Nehru Cup: 2007, 2009
