= Habibur Rehman Mondal =

Indian footballer (born 1986)

Personal information
- Date of birth: 27 May 1986 (age 40)
- Place of birth: West Bengal, India
- Position: Defender

Youth career
- TFA

Senior career*
Years	Team	Apps	(Gls)
2004–2006	East Bengal		
2006–2007	Mohammedan SC		
2007–2010	Mohun Bagan		
2010–2011	Mohammedan SC		
2011–2012	Southern Samity		

International career
2004	India U20		
2006	India U23		
2004–2006	India	10	(0)
- * Club domestic league appearances and goals

Habibur Rehman Mondal (born 1986) is an Indian football player. He has played for Mohun Bagan AC and Mohammedan SC (Kolkata), in the I-League as a defender.

== Career ==
Habibur plays as both right back and center back for Mohun Bagan. Habibur has been capped several times for India.

== Honours ==
India U20

- South Asian Games Silver medal: 2004
