= Joseph Pereira =

Indian footballer

Personal information
- Full name: Joseph Pereira
- Date of birth: 27 June 1982 (age 44)
- Place of birth: MEPPADY, India
- Height: 1.68 m (5 ft 6 in)
- Position: Forward

Team information
- Current team: Sporting Clube de Goa
- Number: 22

Senior career*
Years	Team	Apps	(Gls)
2005–present	Sporting Clube de Goa		
- * Club domestic league appearances and goals

Joseph Pereira (born 27 June) is an Indian footballer for Sporting Clube de Goa. He plays as a forward.

== Career statistics ==
=== Club ===
Statistics accurate as of 11 May 2013

Club	Season	League		Federation Cup		Durand Cup		AFC		Total	
Club	Season	Apps	Goals	Apps	Goals	Apps	Goals	Apps	Goals	Apps	Goals
Sporting Goa	2012–13	16	4	0	0	0	0	—	—	16	4
Career total		16	4	0	0	0	0	0	0	16	4
