= Nathaniel Amos =

Nigerian footballer

Personal information
- Full name: Nathaniel Adisa Amos
- Date of birth: 26 October 1989 (age 37)
- Place of birth: Lagos, Nigeria
- Height: 1.88 m (6 ft 2 in)
- Position: Striker

Team information
- Current team: SC Goa
- Number: 11

Youth career
- 2001–2005: Crown FC

Senior career*
Years	Team	Apps	(Gls)
2006–2008	Crown FC	50	(8)
2008–	SC Goa	53	(21)
- * Club domestic league appearances and goals

Nathaniel Adisa Amos (born 26 October 1989 in Lagos) is a Nigerian professional footballer who last played for Sporting Clube de Goa in the I-League.

== Career ==
Amos began his career with Crown FC and joined 2008 to Indian club SC Goa.
