= Nallappan Mohanraj =

Indian footballer (born 1989)

Personal information
- Full name: Nallappan Mohanraj
- Date of birth: 23 February 1989 (age 37)
- Place of birth: Namakkal, Tamil Nadu, India
- Height: 1.77 m (5 ft 9 1/2 in)
- Position: Left back

Team information
- Current team: Bengaluru United (head coach)

Youth career
- Sports Authority of India
- 2006–2007: HAL

Senior career*
| Years | Team | Apps | (Gls) |
| 2007–2012 | Mohun Bagan | 126 | (8) |
| 2012–2013 | Pune | 26 | (4) |
| 2013–2014 | Mumbai Tigers | 26 | (2) |
| 2014-2015 | → Sporting Goa | 28 | (4) |
| 2015-2016 | Atletico de Kolkata | 24 | (2) |
| 2015-2016 | →Bharat FC (loan) | 28 | (4) |
| 2016-2017 | Chennaiyin | 24 | (2) |
| 2017-2018 | ATK | 22 | (4) |
| 2018-2019 | Churchill Brothers | 24 | (5) |

International career
| 2007–2008 | India U19 | 28 | |
| 2011–2012 | India U23 | 22 | (4) |
| 2011–2016 | India | 39 | (6) |
- * Club domestic league appearances and goals

Nallappan Mohanraj (born 23 February 1989 in Namakkal, Tamil Nadu) is an Indian former professional footballer who played as a left back. He coaches Bengaluru United in the I-League 2.

== Early career ==
Born in Namakkal, Tamil Nadu, Mohanraj started Playing for Sports Authority of India in Chennai. He went for the under-16 and under-19 state selections, and didn't get selected for either. After that, he went for a trial at the Tata Football Academy, and didn't get through. But Carlton Chapman, the assistant coach there, told me he had a good left foot, and sent him for a trial at (I-League 2nd Division side) HAL, Bangalore. Finally, the HAL coach Krishnaji Rao gave him chance.

== Career ==
After his stint at HAL, Mohanraj signed for Mohun Bagan at the beginning of the 2007–08 season. He enjoyed a very successful stint with Mohun Bagan where he won the Indian Federation Cup in 2008, followed up with the ONGC Super Cup and runner-up in the I-League in 2009. In 2012–13 with Pune F.C. he picked up yet another I-League runner up medal.

=== Sporting Goa ===
On 5 February 2014 Mohanraj signed for Sporting Clube de Goa on loan from Mumbai Tigers as their club was disbanded. He made his debut for Sporting Goa on 16 February 2014 in the I-League match against Pune F.C. at the Balewadi Sports Complex in which he started and played the whole match and also earned a yellow card in the 66th minute as Sporting Goa drew the match 1-1.

== International ==
Mohanraj won the 2009 Nehru Cup with the India national team. He was also the captain of the India U-18 team that toured Germany and played against the academy teams of VfB Stuttgart, FC Augsburg and Munich 1860, before participating in the 2008 AFC U-19 Championship tournament in Iran. On 23 February 2011 Mohanraj played his first game for the Indian U23 team against Myanmar.

== Honours ==
India

- SAFF Championship runner-up: 2013

Atlético de Kolkata

- Indian Super League: 2014
