= Felix Chimaokwu =

Nigerian footballer

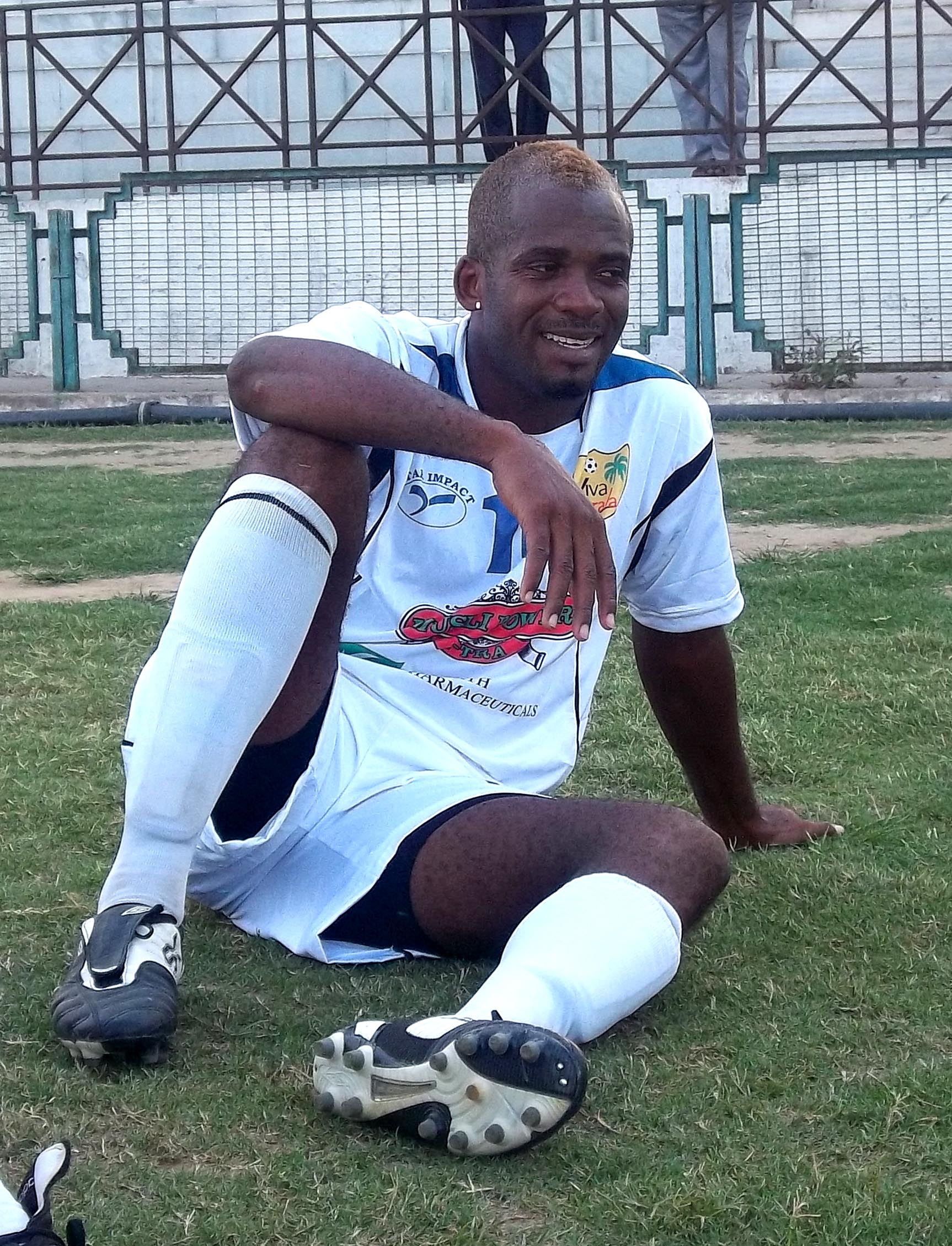

Personal information
- Full name: Felix Chimaokwu
- Date of birth: 7 November 1985 (age 40)
- Place of birth: Nigeria
- Height: 1.83 m (6 ft 0 in)
- Position: Forward

Team information
- Current team: Mohammedan
- Number: 8

Senior career*
Years	Team	Apps	(Gls)
2006–2010	Churchill Brothers SC	66	(25)
2010–2011	Viva Kerala	9	(4)
2011	Mohammedan	2	(0)
- * Club domestic league appearances and goals

Felix Chimaokwu (born 7 November 1985) is a Nigerian footballer who plays in forward position. He played for Mohammedan Sporting in the I-League, and last played for I-League team Churchill Brothers SC. Chimaokwu partnering fellow Nigerian striker Odafe Onyeka Okolie scored record goals and won maiden I-League trophy for Churchill Brothers.

== Honours ==
Calcutta FC (CC&FC)

- Trades Cup: 2004
