= Michael Tayo =

Nigerian footballer

Personal information
- Full name: Michael Segun Tayo
- Date of birth: 17 April 1987 (age 39)
- Place of birth: Nigeria
- Height: 1.79 m (5 ft 10 1/2 in)
- Position: Midfielder

Team information
- Current team: Southern Samity

Senior career*
Years	Team	Apps	(Gls)
2011–	Southern Samity	0	(0)
- * Club domestic league appearances and goals

Michael Tayo (born 17 April) is a Nigerian football player who currently plays for Southern Samity in the Calcutta Football League as a central midfielder. He has represented SC Goa and Air India FC
