= Abel Hammond =

Ghanaian footballer

Personal information
- Full name: Abel Armah Hammond
- Date of birth: 1 June 1985 (age 41)
- Place of birth: Accra, Ghana
- Height: 1.86 m (6 ft 1 in)
- Position: Forward

Youth career
- 1994–2000: Salemi Aces
- 2000: Accra Academy
- 2001–2002: Saint Stars
- 2002–2003: Brescia

Senior career*
Years	Team	Apps	(Gls)
2003–2004	Brescia		
2003	→ Accra Academy (loan)		
2003	→ Cittadella (loan)		
2004–2007	Cologna Veneta		
2007	Sanremese		
2008	Liberty Professionals		
2008–2009	Mumbai FC		
2009–2010	Kingfisher East Bengal Club		
2011	Metalac Gornji Milanovac	4	(0)
2011–2012	in Ghana		
2012	Tema Youth		
- * Club domestic league appearances and goals

Abel Hammond (born 1 June 1985) is a Ghanaian former professional footballer who played as a forward.

== Career ==
Hammond was born in Accra. He began his career with Salemi Aces FC. He studied at Accra Academy Secondary School and played for the Saint Stars in 2001. In 2002, at the age of 17, he joined the primavera team Brescia Calcio and subsequently played for A.S. Cittadella, to which he was loaned to, in 2003. He stayed at A.S. Cittadella for half a year and returned to Brescia Calcio in December 2003. In January 2004 his contract with Brescia Calcio expired and he then moved to Serie D club AC Cologna Veneta. During his three years stint at AC Cologna Veneta, he played in 76 matches and scored 19 goals. His contract with the team expired in the summer of 2007 and he signed for US Sanremese, where he played in only five games. He left the club in November 2007 to sign for Ghana Premier League club Liberty Professionals. On 11 September 2008, Hammond left Liberty Professionals FC to sign for the I-League club Mumbai FC. On 20 September 2009, he signed for Kingfisher East Bengal Club from Mumbai.

In the winter break of the 2010–11 season, Hammond moved back to Europe and signed with Metalac Gornji Milanovac and marked his debut in the Serbian SuperLiga on 2 April 2011 as a substitute in the 1–0 defeat against FK Vojvodina.

== Honours ==
East Bengal

- Indian Federation Cup: 2009
