= Ogba Kalu Nnanna =

Nigerian footballer

Ogba Nnanna
Personal information
- Full name: Nena Kalu Ogba
- Date of birth: 1 March 1984 (age 42)
- Place of birth: Birnin Kebbi, Nigeria
- Height: 1.78 m (5 ft 10 in)
- Position: Midfielder

Team information
- Current team: Churchill Brothers
- Number: 47

Youth career
- 2001–2004: Fadam United
- 2005–2007: Churchill Brothers

Senior career*
Years	Team	Apps	(Gls)
2007–2010	Churchill Brothers	26	(14)
2010–2011	Dempo	8	(1)
2011—2014	Sporting Goa	64	(30)
2014—	Pune F.C.		
2017	Mohammedan S.C. (Kolkata)		
2017–	Churchill Brothers	6	(2)
- * Club domestic league appearances and goals as of 15 January 2018

Nena Kalu Ogba (born 3 January 1989 in Birnin Kebbi, Kebbi) is a Nigerian footballer, who last played for i-League side Churchill Brothers.

== Career ==
Ogba Kalu was one of the leader Churchill Brothers S.C. in the I-League and was nominated as Fans Player of the Year 2010. In July 2010 signed for champions Dempo SC. On 5 July 2017 Mohammeden SC signed Kalu.
