= Mehrajuddin Wadoo =

Indian footballer

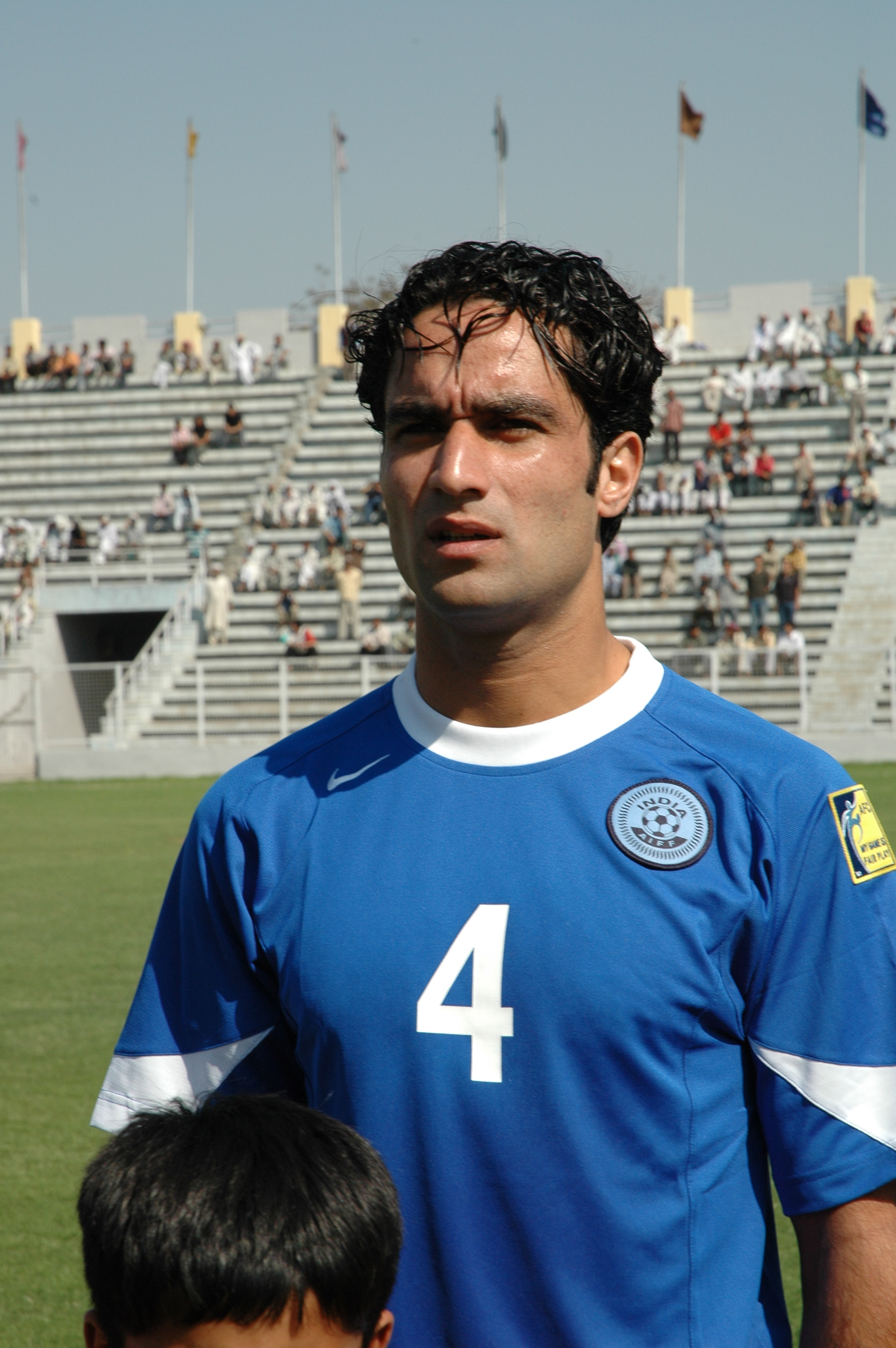
- Wadoo lining up with India in 2007

Personal information
- Full name: Mehrajuddin Wadoo
- Date of birth: 12 February 1984 (age 42)
- Place of birth: Srinagar, Jammu and Kashmir, India
- Height: 6 ft 1 in (1.85 m)
- Position: Defender

Team information
- Current team: Mohammedan (head coach)

Senior career*
Years	Team	Apps	(Gls)
2001–2002	Real Kashmir	32	(2)
2002–2003	HAL	38	(4)
2003–2004	ITI	34	(4)
2004–2007	Mohun Bagan	116	(18)
2007–2011	East Bengal	140	(20)
2011–2012	Salgaocar	30	(4)
2012–2013	Mohun Bagan	34	(4)
2013–2014	Mohammedan Sporting	36	(4)
2014–2015	Pune City	32	(6)
2015–2016	→ Bharat (loan)	28	(2)
2016–2017	Chennaiyin	24	(4)
2016	→ Sporting Goa (loan)	16	(4)
2017–2018	Mumbai	84	(16)
Total		624	(94)

International career
2005–2012	India	54	(4)

Managerial career
- 2018–2019: Pune City (academy coach)
- 2019–2020: Hyderabad (assistant)
- 2021–2022: Sudeva Delhi
- 2022–2023: Real Kashmir
- 2023–2024: Mohammedan
- 2024–2025: Jammu and Kashmir
- 2025–2026: Mohammedan
- 2026–: India U17
Medal record
India
Winner	SAFF Championship	2005
Winner	AFC Challenge Cup	2008
- * Club domestic league appearances and goals

Mehrajuddin Wadoo (born 12 February 1984) is an Indian manager and former professional footballer. He is currently the head coach of the India national under-17 football team.

During his playing days, Wadoo played for clubs such as Mohun Bagan, East Bengal, Mohammedan, Salgaocar, Pune City, Chennaiyin, and Mumbai City. He also represented the India national team from 2005 to 2011.

Wadoo also served as president of Football Players' Welfare Association (FPAI) of India.

== Club career ==
=== Early career ===
He did his early schooling at Muyeen Public School, Sarai Balla, Iqra Masjid up to class X and later joined Sri Pratap High School, Srinagar. He did his BA IInd year from Amar Singh College, Wazir Bagh. He started playing football from a very early age and when he turned 8, he was motivated by his father, Mohd Sultan Wadoo, who had represented J&K in Santosh Trophy to pursue football rather than cricket.

Mehraj joined Iqbal Sports Club in 1996. He was member of U21 team of J&K and was noticed at the National level as a result.

=== Senior career ===
Mehrajuddin started out as a striker but then was converted into a defender, and can easily play as a defensive midfielder position. He started out with Iqbal Sports and then moved to J&K Police and then professionally at a league-level with HAL, ITI, Sporting Goa, Mohun Bagan, East Bengal. Currently he is associated with J&K Sports Council, training young football enthusiasts of Jammu & Kashmir.

== International career ==
He scored the winning goal against Bangladesh in the SAFF Cup finals at Karachi in December 2005. He was also a member of the Indian squad that won Nehru Cup in 2007, the AFC Challenge Cup in 2008 and the Nehru Cup again in 2009.

== Awards & achievements ==
4 times Winner, Federation Cup & IFA Shield. 2 times Winner, Nehru Cup (2007 & 2009). Wadoo was the best right-back in the Hero ISL during Season 2 as he helped Chennaiyin FC to the coveted Hero ISL trophy, appearing 14 times for the Super Machans.

== Managerial career ==
In 2021–22 season, Wadoo managed Sudeva Delhi and worked as coach of the J&K Sports Council. In September 2022, he was appointed head coach of I-League side Real Kashmir after departure of David Robertson. In midway of the 2022–23 season, he was succeeded by English manager Gifton Noel-Williams in the post, in February 2023.

On 21 February 2023, Wadoo replaced Kibu Vicuña in the post of head coach of Mohammedan Sporting. The club struggled to avoided relegation, and managed to finish in eighth position.

== Statistics ==
=== International ===
Statistics accurate as of 16 December 2011.

National team	Year	Apps	Goals
India	2005	2	1
India	2006	5	0
India	2007	4	0
India	2008	7	0
India	2009	5	0
India	2010	5	1
India	2011	4	0
Total		32	2

=== International goals ===
Goal	Date	Venue	Opponent	Score	Result	Competition
1	17 December 2005	Peoples Football Stadium, Karachi, Pakistan	Bangladesh	1–0	2–0	2005 SAFF Cup
2	7 September 2010	Ambedkar Stadium, New Delhi, India	Namibia	1–0	2–0	Friendly

== Managerial statistics ==
As of 12 March 2023

Managerial record by team and tenure
Team	From	To	Record								Ref.
Team	From	To	M	W	D	L	GF	GA	GD	Win %	Ref.
Sudeva Delhi	13 November 2021	31 August 2022	17	4	5	8	13	23	−10	23.53	
Real Kashmir	7 November 2022	1 February 2023	14	5	4	5	11	12	−1	35.71	
Mohammedan	21 February 2023		4	2	0	2	11	9	+2	50.00	
Total			35	11	9	15	35	44	−9	31.43	

== Honours ==
India

- AFC Challenge Cup: 2008
- SAFF Championship: 2005; runner-up: 2008
- Nehru Cup: 2007, 2009

Chennaiyin

- Indian Super League: 2015
