= Marcos Pereira (footballer, born 1973) =

Brazilian footballer

Personal information
- Full name: Marcos Alexandro de Carvalho Pereira
- Date of birth: 18 September 1973 (age 53)
- Place of birth: Brazil
- Height: 1.73 m (5 ft 8 in)
- Position: Midfielder

Senior career*
Years	Team	Apps	(Gls)
2008–	Mohun Bagan A.C.		
- * Club domestic league appearances and goals

Marcos Alexandro de Carvalho Pereira is a retired Brazilian football player.

Pereira had a short stint playing for Mohun Bagan A.C. in the I-League in India as a midfielder. Before that, he played club football in Punjab for JCT FC. He was the Football coach of the Techno India Group Public School, Hooghly Chinsurah for 2 years (2016-17) and resumed coaching in July 2019.
