= Theodore Sunday Wrobeh =

Liberian footballer (born 1981)

Theodore
Personal information
- Full name: Theodore Sunday Wrobeh
- Place of birth: Liberia
- Position: Striker

Senior career*
Years	Team	Apps	(Gls)
2006–2008	Prayag United S.C.		
2008–2011	Mohammedan S.C. (Kolkata)		
- * Club domestic league appearances and goals

Theodore Sunday Wrobeh (born 21 October 1981) is a Liberian football player who last played as a forward for Mohammedan S.C. (Kolkata) in the I-League.
