= José Barreto (Brazilian footballer) =

Brazilian footballer and coach (born 1976)

Jose Ramirez Barreto
Personal information
- Full name: Jose Marcio Ramirez Barreto
- Date of birth: 3 September 1976 (age 50)
- Place of birth: Rio de Janeiro
- Height: 1.71 m (5 ft 7 in)
- Position: Striker

Senior career*
| Years | Team | Apps | (Gls) |
| 1994–1998 | Grêmio | 58 | (45) |
| 1998–1999 | Kawasaki Frontale | 34 | (22) |
| 1999–2004 | Mohun Bagan | 180 | (130) |
| 2004–2005 | Penang FA | 46 | (32) |
| 2005–2006 | Mahindra United | 24 | (16) |
| 2006–2012 | Mohun Bagan | 191 | (102) |
| 2012–2014 | Bhawanipore | 78 | (60) |

Managerial career
- 2014–2015: ATK (assistant)
- 2025–: Howrah Hooghly Warriors
- * Club domestic league appearances and goals

José Marcio Ramirez Barreto (born 3 September 1976) is a Brazilian football manager and former forward who serves as the head coach of the Bengal Super League club Howrah Hooghly Warriors. He is best known for his playing career with Mohun Bagan AC. 2007–08, Later he played for Calcutta Football League outfit Bhawanipore FC, and captained the team. He also worked as assistant coach of Indian Super League club Atlético de Kolkata in 2019.

== Career ==
=== Mohun Bagan ===
Barreto came to India after signing with Mohun Bagan AC in 1999. In June 2006, he switched from Mahindra United back to Mohun Bagan, for an Indian football record transfer fee of 60 lakhs.

He played his last match for Mohun Bagan on 6 May 2012 against Pune FC in last round of I-League match. He made 398 appearances for The Mariners.

Barreto still remains fifth in the list of top goalscorers in NFL/I-League with 101 goals, 94 of those came while playing for Bagan. He is also the all time top goalscorer of Federation Cup with 27 goals.

=== Bhawanipore ===
Barreto joined Bhawanipore in 2012, appointment captain of the Calcutta Football League outfit.

== Honours ==
Individual

- National Football League Golden Boot: 2000–01 (14 goals)
- Dhiren Dey Award by Mohun Bagan AC: 2001
- Federation Cup all time top goalscorer (with 27 goals)

== Bibliography ==
- Sen, Dwaipayan (2013). "Wiping the Stain Off the Field of Plassey: Mohun Bagan in 1911". In Bandyopadhyay, Kausik; Mallick, Sabyasachi (eds.). Fringe Nations in World Soccer. Routledge. ISBN 978-1-317-99810-5.
- Sen, Ronojoy (2015). "The Empire Strikes Back: The 1911 IFA Shield and Football in Calcutta". Nation at Play: A History of Sport in India. Columbia University Press. ISBN 978-0-231-16490-0.
- Kapadia, Novy (2017). Barefoot to Boots: The Many Lives of Indian Football. Penguin Random House. ISBN 978-0-143-42641-7.
- Mukhopadhay, Subir (2018). সোনায় লেখা ইতিহাসে মোহনবাগান (transl. Mohun Bagan in the history written in gold). ISBN 978-93-850172-0-9.
- Banerjee, Argha; Basu, Rupak (2022). মোহনবাগান: সবুজ ঘাসের মেরুন গল্প (transl. Mohun Bagan: Green fields' Maroon stories). Shalidhan. ISBN 978-81-954667-0-2.
- Dineo, Paul; Mills, James (2001). Soccer in South Asia: Empire, Nation, Diaspora. London, United Kingdom: Frank Cass Publishers. p. 33. ISBN 978-0-7146-8170-2. Archived from the original on 25 July 2022.
- Martinez, Dolores; Mukharji, Projit B (2009). Football: From England to the World: The Many Lives of Indian Football. Routledge. ISBN 978-1-138-88353-6. Archived from the original on 2 July 2022.
- Nath, Nirmal (2011). History of Indian Football: Upto 2009–10. Readers Service. ISBN 9788187891963. Archived from the original on 22 July 2022.
