= Lalkamal Bhowmick =

Indian footballer and coach

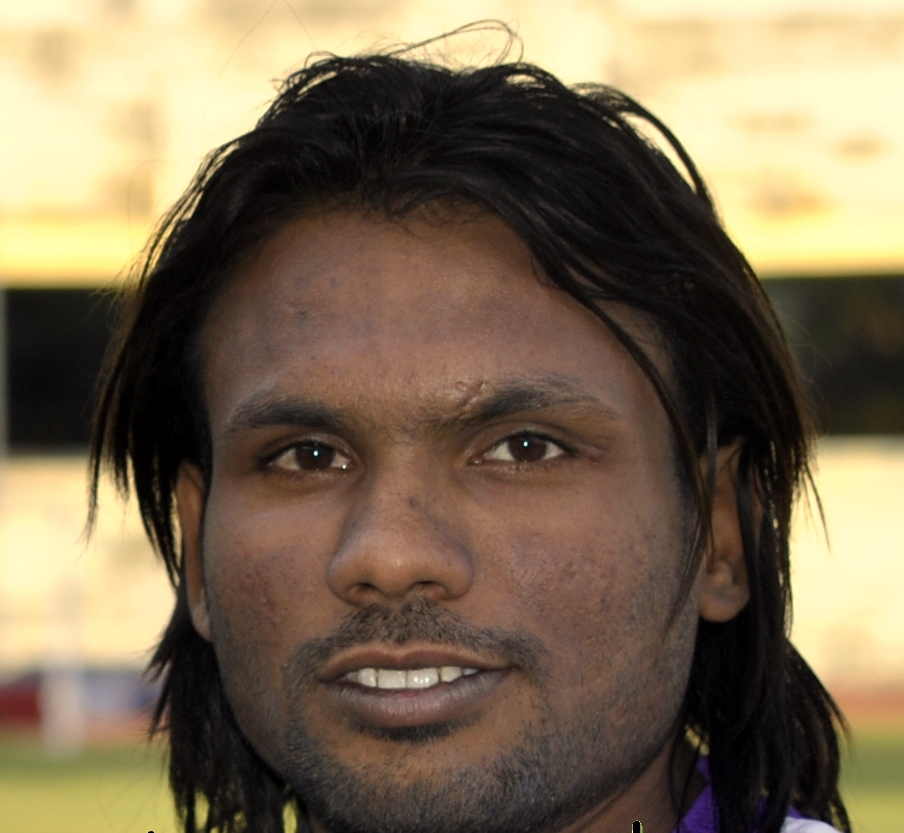

Personal information
- Date of birth: 2 January 1987 (age 39)
- Place of birth: Kolkata, West Bengal, India
- Height: 5 ft 7 in (1.70 m)
- Position: Central midfielder

Team information
- Current team: United SC (head coach)

Senior career*
Years	Team	Apps	(Gls)
2005–2010	Mohun Bagan	110	(21)
2010–2014	United SC	35	(4)
2014–2016	Mohun Bagan	15	(5)
2018–2019	Pathachakra	3	(0)

International career^{‡}
2005–2006	India U19	22	(4)
2008	India	1	(0)

Managerial career
- 2025–: United SC (head coach)
- * Club domestic league appearances and goals ‡ National team caps and goals as of 14 November 2009

Lalkamal Bhowmick, also spelled Lal Kamlal, (born 2 January 1987 in Kolkata) is an Indian professional football manager and former player who is the head coach of I-League 2 and Calcutta Football League club United SC.

== Career ==
He joined SAIL Football Academy in Bokaro and was there for four years, before joining Eveready (Chirag United) and then Mohun Bagan.

He spent four seasons at Mohun Bagan. He was voted the best young player of the Year for the 2007 I-League season for his excellent performances for Bagan. In December 2008 he scored in the group stage of the Federation Cup, and Mohun Bagan went on to win the tournament.

As of September 2012 he was playing for Prayag United in the I-League.

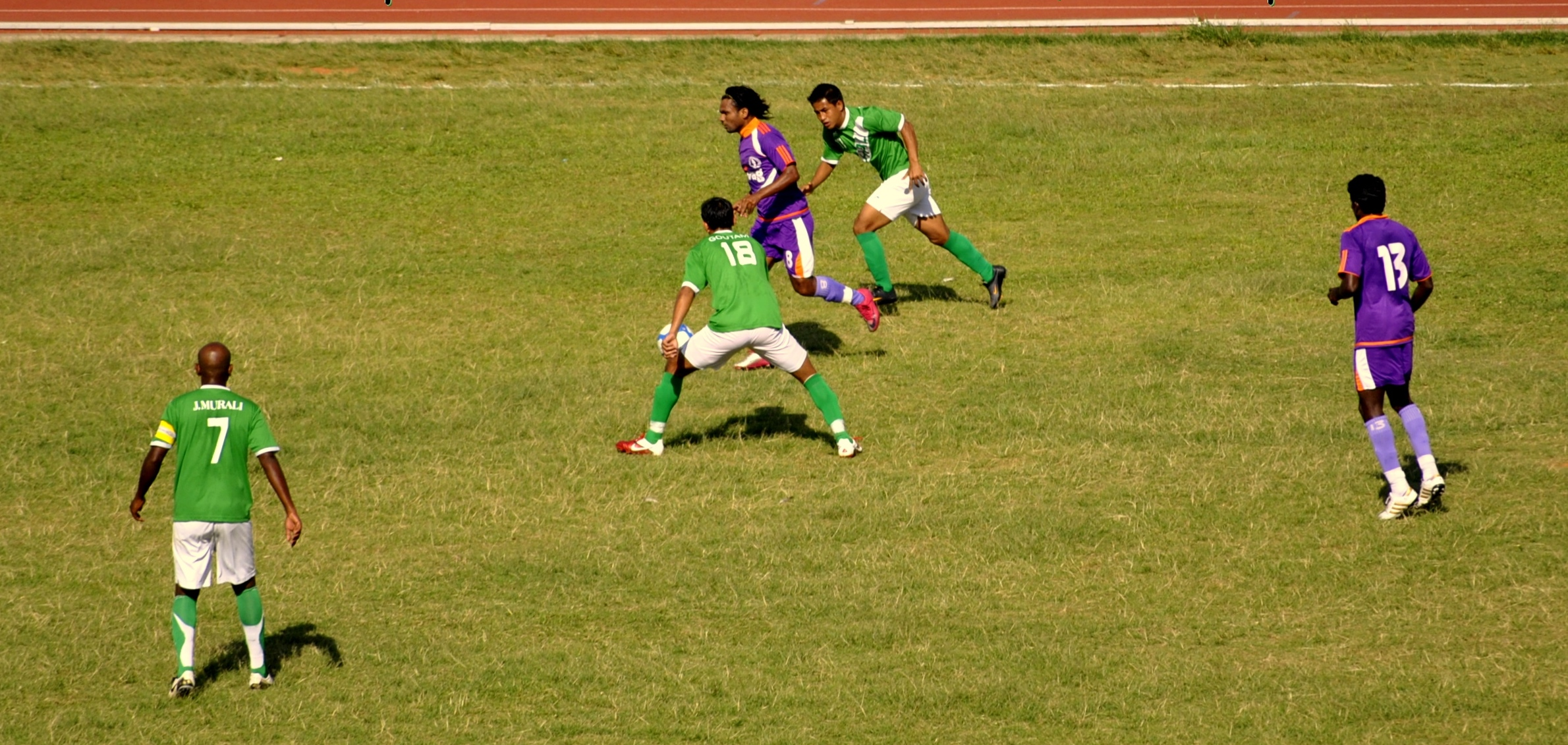
Lalkamal raiding HAL defense in 2010–11 I-league

He only played 9 games for United in the 2013-14 season due to injury. In May 2014 Bhowmick announced that he was rejoining former club Mohun Bagan for the 2014-15 season. He left United because of the club's financial troubles.

== International career ==
In February 2013, he was named in the India national football team for the 2014 AFC Challenge Cup qualifiers.
