= James Singh Lukram =

Indian footballer (born 1981)

James Singh
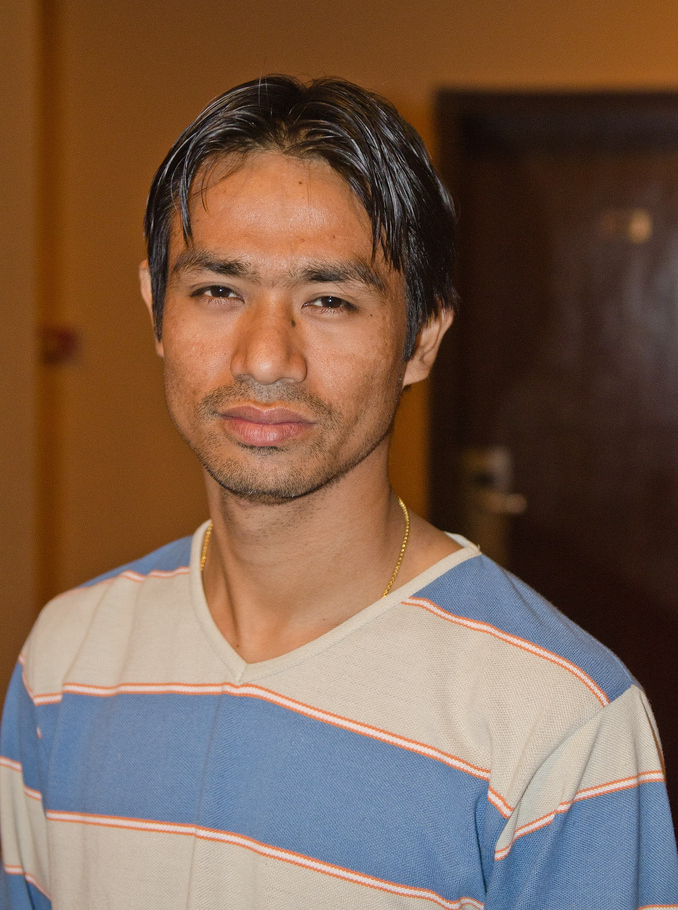

Personal information
- Full name: James Singh Lukram
- Date of birth: 1 March 1981 (age 45)
- Place of birth: Imphal, Manipur, India
- Height: 1.70 m (5 ft 7 in)
- Position: Winger

Youth career
- 1996–1998: Tata FA

Senior career*
Years	Team	Apps	(Gls)
1998–1999	Bengal Mumbai		
1999–2002	Mohun Bagan		
2002–2003	ITI Limited		
2003–2004	Mahindra United		
2004–2005	Indian Bank		
2005–2007	Mahindra United		
2007–2010	Mohun Bagan		
2010–2011	Salgaocar		
2011–2013	Prayag United		
2013	→ United Sikkim (loan)		

International career
2003–2006	India	28	(3)
- * Club domestic league appearances and goals

James Singh Lukram (Meitei: Lukram James Singh, born 1 March 1981) is an Indian former footballer who played as a winger for the India national football team.

== International career ==
Singh made his international debut for India national team on 16 October 2003, against Thailand in a friendly match. Between 2003 and 2006, he has appeared in 28 matches for his country, scoring 3 goals.

== Honours ==
India

- SAFF Championship: 2005

Manipur

- Santosh Trophy: 2002–03
