= List of foreign football players in India =

This list of foreign football players in India consists of players who are currently playing or have played in India, either in top division leagues like Indian Super League, Indian Football League (formerly I-League) (alongside now defunct National Football League I, II & III), I-League 2, I-League 3 or in regional competitions such as Calcutta Football League, Goa Football League, etc. alongside domestic knock-out tournaments such as the IFA Shield and Durand Cup.

- All these players have joined or played or contracted as foreign recruit or footballer for the football clubs all over India.
- The following players must meet both of the following criteria:
1. A player who joined any Indian football club (irrespective of whether he made an appearance for the team or not).
2. A player is considered foreign if he is not eligible to play for the India national team.
- **Bold** denotes players who have appeared or included in the squad in any edition of the **FIFA World Cup**.

== Naturalized player(s) ==
=== East Pakistan ===
- Balai Dey – East Bengal FC (1965–1967)
- Tarapada Ray – East Bengal FC (1954–1955)

=== Japan ===
- Arata Izumi – East Bengal FC (2006–2007) Mahindra United (2007–2009) Pune FC (2009–2015) Atlético de Kolkata (2015) Mumbai FC (2016) FC Pune City (2016) NEROCA FC (2017) Kerala Blasters FC (2017–2018)

=== Australia ===
- Ryan Williams – Bengaluru FC (2023–present)

== Afghanistan ==
- Ahmad Hatifi – Mumbai F.C. (2013–2014)
- Balal Arezou – Churchill Brothers SC (2013)
- Djelaludin Sharityar – Mumbai F.C. (2017)
- Farshad Noor – Gokulam Kerala FC (2022–2023)
- Faysal Shayesteh – Gokulam Kerala F.C. (2017–2018)
- Hamidullah Karimi – Delhi United FC (2015–2017) Meghe United (2018)
- Hashmatullah Barakzai – Mumbai F.C. (2013)
- Ismail Aseel – FC Kerala (2018–2019) Kalighat Milan Sangha (2019–2020)
- Jamil Nasiri – Mohammedan Sporting (2019–2020)
- Maruf Fazly – Hindustan F.C. (2018–2020)
- Masih Saighani – Aizawl F.C. (2017–2018), Chennaiyin F.C. (2019–2020)
- Mohammad Mashriqi – Bhawanipore FC (2013–2014)
- Mujtaba Faiz – Air India FC (2013)
- Sandjar Ahmadi – Mumbai F.C. (2013–2014)
- Sharif Mukhammad – Gokulam Kerala FC (2020–2022), Churchill Brothers FC (2022-2023)
- Zohib Islam Amiri – Mumbai F.C. (2011–2014) Dempo SC (2014–2015) FC Goa (2014) DSK Shivajians F.C. (2015–2016) Chennai City F.C. (2017) Gokulam Kerala F.C. (2019–2020) Real Kashmir FC (2021)

== Albania ==
- Armando Sadiku – Mohun Bagan SG (2023–24), FC Goa (2024-2025)

== Algeria ==
- Yannis Bessaa – NEROCA FC (2020–2021)

== Andorra ==
- Óscar Sonejee – Churchill Brothers SC (2008)

== Angola ==
- Amestrong Alexandré – Hindustan FC (2017–2018) Vajra United (2019–2020)

== Argentina ==
- Alexis Gómez – Sudeva Delhi FC (2023) Mohammedan SC (2023-2025)
- Diego Bielkiewicz – Rajasthan United FC (2021–2022)
- Diego Colotto – FC Pune City (2015–2016)
- Diego Nadaya – Mumbai City F.C. (2014–2015)
- Fabricio Ortiz – Gokulam Kerala F.C. (2018)
- Facundo Cardozo – Mumbai City FC (2016)
- Facundo Pereyra – Kerala Blasters FC (2020–2021)
- Gastón Sangoy – Mumbai City FC (2016)
- Germán Gonzalo Cabrera – Vasco S.C. (2013)
- Gustavo Oberman – FC Pune City (2016)
- Javier López – North East United FC (2015–2016)
- Jorge Pereyra Díaz – Kerala Blasters FC (2021–2022) Mumbai City FC (2022–2024); (2025-Present) Bengaluru FC (2024-2025)
- Juan Carlos Nellar – Gokulam Kerala FC (2022–present)
- Julian Camino – East Bengal F.C. (1988)
- Martín Pérez Guedes – Odisha FC (2019–2020)
- Matías Defederico – Mumbai City FC (2016)
- Matías Verón – Aizawl FC (2020); (2022–2023) Muthoot Football Academy (2022) George Telegraph SC (2022)
- Mauro dos Santos – Rajasthan United FC (2022)
- Maximiliano Álvarez – Chirag United Kerala FC (2008–2009)
- Maximiliano Barreiro – NorthEast United FC (2019–2020)
- Nicolás Vélez – NorthEast United FC (2015)
- Omar Sebastián Monesterolo – East Bengal F.C. (2009–2010)
- Robertino Pugliara – FC Pune City (2017–2018)

== Armenia ==
- Apoula Edël Bete – ATK (2014) Chennaiyin F.C. (2015) FC Pune City (2016)
- Emil Vartazarian – Mohammedan S.C. (2001–2002) Bengal Mumbai FC (2003–2004)

== Australia ==
- Aaron Evans – NorthEast United FC (2022–2023)
- Aleksandar Jovanovic – Bengaluru FC (2022–2025)
- Andrew Barisic – East Bengal FC (2013) Kerala Blasters FC (2014)
- Antun Kovacic – Churchill Brothers SC (2011–2012)
- Aryn Williams – NEROCA FC (2017–2019)
- Brendan Hamill – Mohun Bagan SG (2022–2024)
- Cameron Watson – Bengaluru FC (2016–2017) Mohun Bagan (2018)
- Chris Herd – Chennaiyin FC (2018–2019)
- Chris Payne – East Bengal FC (2017)
- Daniell Zeleny – Mohun Bagan (2011–2012) Churchill Brothers (2014)
- Dario Vidošić – ATK (2019–2020)
- David Williams – ATK (2019–2020) Mohun Bagan SG (2020–2022)
- **Dimitri Petratos** – Mohun Bagan SG (2022–present)
- Diogo Ferreira – Mohun Bagan (2017)
- Dylan Fox – NorthEast United FC (2020–2021) FC Goa (2021–2022)
- Eli Babalj – ATK (2018)
- Emile Demey – Fateh Hyderabad A.F.C. (2018–2019)
- Erik Paartalu – Bengaluru FC (2017–2021)
- Harry Sawyer – Jamshedpur FC (2022–2023)
- Jacob Tratt – Odisha FC (2020–2021)
- James Donachie – FC Goa (2020–2021)
- James Meyer – Pune FC (2013–2014)
- **Jamie Maclaren** – Mohun Bagan (2024–present)
- **Jason Cummings** – Mohun Bagan SG (2023–present)
- Jason Jude Starr – Sudeva Moonlight FC (2019–2020)
- Jerrad Tyson – Chennai City FC (2018)
- Joel Chianese – Hyderabad FC (2020–2023)
- Jordan Murray – Kerala Blasters FC (2020–2021) Jamshedpur FC (2021–2022)
- Jordan O'Doherty – East Bengal FC (2022–2023)
- Josh Maguire – Sporting Clube De Goa (2010–2011)
- Keegan Nash – Prayag United SC (2009)
- Matthew Foschini – Salgaocar SC (2013–2014)
- Matthew Grbesa – United Sports Club (2009–2010)
- Matthew Mayora – Southern Samity (2012) Shillong Lajong FC (2012)
- Michael Matricciani – Chirag United Kerala (2011–2012)
- Milan Susak – East Bengal FC (2014–2015)
- Mirjan Pavlović – Pune FC (2014)
- Nicholas Andrew Ward – NEROCA FC (2018–2019)
- Nick Fitzgerald – Jamshedpur FC (2020–2021)
- Okwy Diamondstar – Mohun Bagan (2010–2011)
- Osama Malik – Odisha FC (2022–2023)
- Patrick Flottmann – NorthEast United FC (2021–2022)
- Rostyn Griffiths – Mumbai City FC (2022–2024)
- Scott Neville – SC East Bengal (2020–2021)
- Sean Rooney – Salgaocar SC (2012) Bengaluru FC (2013–2015)
- **Simon Colosimo** – Dempo SC (2013–2014)
- Simon Storey – Mohun Bagan (2011–2012)
- Srećko Mitrović – East Bengal FC (2009–2010)
- Steve Hayes – United Sikkim FC (2013)
- **Tim Cahill** –Jamshedpur FC (2018–2019)
- Tolgay Özbey – East Bengal FC (2010–2012) Mohun Bagan (2012–2013) Mohammedan Sporting (2013) FC Goa (2014) Dempo SC (2014–2015)
- Tomi Juric – NorthEast United FC (2024)
- Tomislav Mrcela – SC East Bengal (2021–2022)
- Travis Paul Major – RoundGlass Punjab (2021–2022)

== Austria ==
- Marko Stanković – FC Pune City (2017–2019) Hyderabad FC (2019–2020)
- Emmanuel Akwuegbu – Sporting Clube De Goa (2010–2011)
- Marco Sahanek – NorthEast United (2022)
- Marc Andre Schmerböck – Mohammedan Sporting (2025)

== Bahrain ==
- Mahmood Mahdi Al-Ajmi – Gokulam Kerala FC (2018)
- Mohammed Nabeel – Air India FC (2009–2010)
- Thiago Fernandes – Gokulam Kerala F.C. (2018)

== Bangladesh ==
- Syed Ali Ahmed – Mohammedan Sporting (19??–1910)
- Syed Abdus Samad – Calcutta Town Club (1912–1915) Calcutta Orients Club (1918) Mohammedan Sporting (1933–1938)
- Habibullah Bahar Chowdhury – Mohammedan Sporting (1930s)
- Sirajuddin – Mohammedan Sporting Club (1930–1935; 1937–1941) Kalighat FC (1936)
- Abbas Mirza – Mohammedan Sporting Club (1934–1939) Calcutta Customs (1940s)
- Romizuddin Ahmed – East Bengal F.C. (1931–1935) Mohammedan Sporting Club (1931)
- Rashid Ahmed – Kalighat FC (1933–1935) Mohammedan Sporting Club (1936–1937)
- Abdur Rahman – Mohammedan Sporting (1936–1941) Eastern Railway FC (1942–19??)
- Taslimuddin Ahmed – Mohammedan Sporting Club (1936–1947)
- B. Roy Chowdhury – East Bengal F.C. (1938) Mohun Bagan (1939–1942)
- Mohammad Shahjahan – Mohammedan Sporting Club (1938–1939) East Bengal F.C. (1940–1947)
- Masudur Rahman – Mohammedan Sporting Club (1932–1938) East Bengal (1939–??) Mohun Bagan (19??–??)
- Khondkar Nasim Ahmed – Mohammedan Sporting Club (1940s) Aryan FC (1940–1947)
- Alauddin Khan – East Bengal Club (1942) Eastern Railway FC (1943–1947)
- Motahar Ali Khan – George Telegraph (1942–1944) Mohammedan Sporting (1944–1947)
- Illias Uddin Ahmed – Mohammedan Sporting Club (1945–1946)
- Wajeed Ali Miazi – Mohammedan Sporting Club (1945–1946)
- George Macwa – Mohammedan Sporting Club (1955)
- Khandoker Wasim Iqbal – East Bengal (1987–1988)
- Monem Munna – East Bengal F.C. (1991) (1993) (1998)
- Sheikh Mohammad Aslam – East Bengal FC (1991)
- Golam Mohammad Gaus – East Bengal F.C. (1991)
- Rizvi Karim Rumi – East Bengal F.C. (1991)
- Mohammed Jewel Rana – Mohammedan Sporting Club (1991) Mohun Bagan (1998–2000)
- Kaiser Hamid – Mohammedan Sporting (1991)
- Rezaul Karim Rehan – Mohammedan Sporting (1991)
- SM Salahuddin – Mohammedan Sporting (1991)
- Mohammed Ponir – Mohammedan Sporting (1991)
- Rumman Bin Wali Sabbir – Mohammedan Sporting Club (1991)
- Nurul Haque Manik – Mohammedan Sporting Club (1991)
- Rakib Hossain – East Bengal F.C. (1995)
- Mizanur Rahman Mizan – East Bengal F.C. (1995)
- Monwar Hossain Munna – Mahindra United FC (1998)
- Alfaz Ahmed – Mohun Bagan (2000–2001)
- Imtiaz Ahmed Nakib – Mohun Bagan (2000–2001)
- Mohammed Ali Reza – Tollygunge Agragami FC (2001)
- Mamunul Islam – Athletico De Kolkata (2014)
- Jamal Bhuyan – Mohammedan Sporting Club (2020–2021)

== Barbados ==
- Samuel Matthew Gibson – Bhawanipore FC (2011–2012)

== Bermuda ==
- Keith Jennings – FC Kochin (1998–2000)
- Eugene Dean – FC Kochin (1998–1999)

== Belarus ==
- Dzmitry Kowb – Minerva Punjab FC (2017)
- Ivan Veras – Aizawl FC (2023–present)

== Belgium ==
- Benjamin Lambot – NorthEast United FC (2020–2021)
- Kristof Van Hout – Delhi Dynamos F.C. (2014–2015)
- Robin Bounougou Edoa – Pune F.C. (2007–2008)
- Wim Raymaekers – Delhi Dynamos F.C. (2014–2015)

== Benin ==
- Coffi Edem Agbessi – Mohun Bagan (2005–2006)
- Obinna Winners Onyia – FC Kochin (2000–2001)
- Romuald Boco – Kalyani Bharat FC (2015)

== Bhutan ==
- Chencho Gyeltshen – Minerva Punjab FC (2017–2018) Bengaluru FC (2018–2019) NEROCA FC (2019) RoundGlass Punjab FC (2020–2021) Kerala Blasters FC (2021–2022)
- Lhendup Dorji – Lonestar Kashmir F.C. (2019–2020)
- Chencho Nio – Royal Wahingdoh (2011–2012) Luangmual F.C. (2012–2013)
- Chencho Dorji – Royal Wahingdoh FC (2011–2012)
- Chimi Dorji – FC Kerala (2018–2019)
- Choki Wangchuk – ARA F.C. (2018–2020)
- Tshering Dorji – Madhya Bharat SC (2018) Aizawl F.C. (2019) South United F.C. (2019–2020)
- Sonam Tenzin – Buddhist Blue Stars (2004–2013)
- Kezang Dorji – Khemat FC Uppa (2016–2017) Capital Complex FC (2019–2020)
- Lungtok Dawa – Quartz F.C. (2018–2019)
- Biren Basnet – Kenkre F.C. (2017) Quartz F.C. (2018–2019)
- Karma Shedrup Tshering – Gangtok Himalayan SC (2013)
- Jigme Tshering Dorji – Muthoot FA (2022–present)

== Bosnia and Herzegovina ==
- Srećko Mitrović – East Bengal FC (2009–2010)
- Nedo Turković – NEROCA FC (2017–2018)
- Saša Kolunija – DSK Shivajians (2016–2017)
- Nenad Novaković – Churchill Brothers S.C. (2018–2019)
- Vladimir Molerović – Chennai City FC (2020–2021)
- Enes Sipović – Chennaiyin FC (2020–2021) Kerala Blasters FC (2021–2022)
- Ismar Tandir – Mohamedan Sporting (2021–2022)
- Adnan Šećerović – RoundGlass Punjab FC (2022–present)

== Botswana ==
- Ofentse Nato – Atlético de Kolkata (2014–2016)

== Bulgaria ==
- Dimitar Berbetov – Kerala Blasters FC (2017)
- Georji Ventseslavov Bizev – Chirag United Kerala (2006–2007)

== Brazil ==
- Adilson Carlos – NorthEast United FC (2017)
- Alex Willian – Mumbai F.C. (2017)
- André Luiz Rodrigues – Ozone FC (2018)
- Alex Monteiro Lima – Jamshedpur FC (2020–2022) East Bengal Club (2022)
- Amaury Nunes – Churchill Brothers S.C. (2010–2011)
- **André Santos** – FC Goa (2014)
- Anderson Reberio – Dempo S.C. (1998–1999)
- Alan Henrique Costa – Bengaluru FC (2021–present)
- **Roberto Carlos** – Delhi Dynamos FC (2015)
- Cleiton Silva – Bengaluru FC (2020–2022) East Bengal Club (2022–present)
- Diego Maurício – Odisha FC (2020–2021) Mumbai City FC (2022) Odisha FC (2022–present)
- Fábio Pena – Shillong Lajong F.C. (2016–2017)
- Anderson Raimundo Silva – Mumbai F.C. (2016–2017)
- Beto – Mohun Bagan (2004–2005), Dempo S.C. (2005–2011, Churchill Brothers S.C. (2012–13), Dempo S.C. (2013–2014)
- Ossius Luis Ferreira – East Bengal F.C. (1999–2000)
- Deyvison Rogério da Silva – Hyderabad FC (2019–2020)
- Bruno Perone – Kerala Blasters FC (2015)
- Otacilio Brito Alves – Mumbai City FC (2016)
- Charles – Chennai City F.C. (2017) East Bengal F.C. (2017–2018)
- Chicão – Delhi Dynamos FC (2015)
- Cristiano Hilario Oliveira – East Bengal F.C. (2006–2007)
- Danilo – NorthEast United FC (2017–2018)
- Danilo Quipapá – Minerva Punjab FC (2019–2020) Roundglass Punjab (2020–2021)
- Rodrigo Calisto de Almeida – Mahindra United FC (2004–2005)
- Diego Carlos – FC Pune City (2017–2019) Mumbai City F.C. (2019–2020)
- Diego Patriota – TRAU F.C. (2020)
- Éder Montairo – Chennaiyin FC (2015) Salgaocar F.C. (2016) Chennaiyin FC (2016)
- Edmar Figueira – Pune FC (2009–2011), Rangdajied United F.C. (2013–2014)
- Edmilson Marques Pardal – Chirag United SC (2009–2010), East Bengal F.C. (2012–2013)
- Eli Sabiá Filho – Chennaiyin FC (2016–2017), (2018–2021) Jamshedpur FC (2021–present)
- Éverton Santos – Mumbai City FC (2017–2018), ATK (2018–2019)
- Fábio Neves – NorthEast United (2016)
- Fabio Vidal – Mohun Bagan (2006–2007) Churchill Brothers S.C. (2007–2009)
- Gabriel Lima Silva – Kerala United FC (2021–present)
- Gustavo Silva Conceição – Mohun Bagan (2015)
- Hudson Lima Da Silva – Mohun Bagan (2011–2012), Bhawanipore F.C. (2012–2013)
- Gustavo Lazzaretti – NorthEast United (2016)
- Jairo Rodrigues – Kerala Blasters FC (2019)
- Saulo De Aquino – ARA FC (2020–2021)
- Jonatan Lucca – FC Goa (2015), FC Pune City (2016–2018)
- Jose Ramirez Barreto – Mohun Bagan (1999–2003), Mahindra United FC (2005–2006), Mohun Bagan (2006–2012)
- Josimar – United Sports Club (2009–2012) Salgaocar SC (2013) Mohammedan Sporting Club (2013–2014) Mumbai F.C. (2015) Dempo S.C. (2015–2016)
- Julio César – FC Goa (2016)
- Léo Mourã – FC Goa (2015)
- Léo Costa – Mumbai City FC (2016–2018)
- Luciano Sabrosa – Mohammedan S.C. (Kolkata) (2013–2014) Pune F.C. (2014–2015) FC Goa (2015) Mohun Bagan (2016) FC Goa (2016)
- Lucas Luiz Scalon – Chennai City F.C. (2017)
- Mailson Alves – Chennaiyin FC (2015), NorthEast (2016) Chennaiyin FC (2017–2019)
- Manoel Morais Amorim – NorthEast United FC (2016)
- Marcel Sacramento – TRAU F.C. (2019–2020)
- Marcelinho Leite Pereira – Delhi Dynamos FC (2016) FC Pune City (2017–2019) Hyderabad FC (2019–2020) Odisha FC (2020–2021) Mohun Bagan SG (2021) Rajasthan United FC (2021–2022) NorthEast United FC (2022)
- Marcinho – NorthEast United FC (2017–2018)
- Márcio Rosário – Mumbai City FC (2017–2018)
- Marcio Silva Santos – Chennai City F.C. (2018)
- Marcos Thank – Chennai City F.C. (2017)
- Memo – Delhi Dynamos FC (2016) Jamshedpur FC (2017–2020) Chennaiyin FC (2020–2021)
- Paquito – East Bengal F.C. (2004–2005)
- Paulinho Dias – Delhi Dynamos FC (2017–2018)
- Rafael Bastos – Mumbai City F.C. (2018–2019)
- Rafael Coelho – FC Goa (2015–2016)
- Rafael Crivellaro – Chennaiyin FC (2019–present)
- Rafael Dumas – FC Goa (2016)
- Raphael Augusto – Chennaiyin FC (2015–2019), Bengaluru F.C. (2019–2020)
- Richarlyson Barbosa – FC Goa (2016)
- Roberto Volpato – Mumbai City FC (2016)
- Roberto Bressa da Silva – Vasco S.C. (2007–2008)
- Robert William Souza – Ozone FC (2018) Minerva Punjab FC (2018)
- Rodrigo Arroz – Kerala Blasters FC (2015)
- Sérgio Barboza – Minerva Punjab FC (2019–2020) Minerva Delhi FC (2021–present)
- Thiago Santos – Mumbai City FC (2017–2018)
- Trindade Gonçalves – FC Goa (2016) Jamshedpur FC (2017–2018)
- Uilliams – Shillong Lajong F.C. (2013–2016)
- Valci Júnior – Punjab F.C. (2020)
- Victor Simões – FC Goa (2015)
- Vinícius – Delhi Dynamos FC (2015)
- Ossius Luiz Ferreira – East Bengal F.C. (1999–2000)
- **Elano Blumer** – Chennaiyin FC (2014–2015)
- Bruno Pelissari – Chennaiyin FC (2014–2015) Delhi Dynamos FC (2016), Gokulam Kerala F.C. (2019)
- Gerson Vieira – Mumbai City FC (2016–2018), ATK (2018–2019)
- Gustavo Marmentini – Delhi Dynamos FC (2014–2015)
- Gustavo Silva Conceição – Mohun Bagan (2015)
- Pedro Gusmao – Kerala Blasters FC (2014)
- André Moritz – Mumbai City FC (2014–2015)
- Guilherme Batata – Northeast United FC (2014) Gokulam Kerala FC (2018–2019)
- Elinton Andrade – FC Goa (2015)
- Reinaldo Cruz Oliveira – FC Goa (2015–2016)
- **Lúcio** – FC Goa (2015–2016)
- Jacson – Langsning F.C. (2019–2020)
- Lucas Luiz Scalon – Chennai City F.C. (2017–2018)
- Marcos Thank – Chennai City F.C. (2017–2018)
- Robert William De Souza Ribeiro – Ozone F.C. (2017–2018) Minerva Punjab F.C. (2018–2019)
- Fábio Cortez Vidal – Mohun Bagan (2004–2005)
- Robinho – Mumbai F.C. (2016–2017)
- Bruno Bryan – Fateh Hyderabad A.F.C (2016–2017)
- Cristiano de Lima – Dempo S.C. (2003–2004) East Bengal FC (2002–2003)
- Vitinho – Vasco S.C. (2005–2006)
- João Victor – Chennaiyin FC (2020–present)
- Marcos Alexandro Pereira – Vasco S.C. (2001–2002) Mohun Bagan (2002–2003) (2009–2010) Churchill Brothers S.C. (2004–2005) JCT F.C. (2005–2006) Salgaocar S.C. (2003–2004)
- Daniel Jorge – East Bengal F.C. (2006–2007)
- Erwin Spitzner – Kerala Blasters FC (2014)
- Luis Carlos Santos – Fateh Hyderabad A.F.C. (2016–2017)
- Nacimento Silveira – Dempo S.C. (2008–2009) Churchill Brothers S.C. (2009–2010) United S.C. (2010–2011)
- Alexandro da Silva Santos – East Bengal F.C. (2010–2011)
- Preto – East Bengal F.C. (1997–1998)
- Thiago Ferreira da Costa – East Bengal F.C. (2006–2007)
- Marcio Fernandes Tomaz – East Bengal F.C. (2006–2007)
- Luiz Octavio Alvez de Souza – East Bengal F.C. (2006–2007)
- Juliano Martins – East Bengal F.C. (2004–2005)
- Paolo Da Silva – East Bengal F.C. (2004–2005)
- Daniel Jorge – East Bengal F.C. (2006–2007)
- Edson K. Wanderley – Vasco S.C. (1999–2000)
- Flavio Lopez – Mohun Bagan (2000–2001)
- Robson Santana – Mumbai FC (2016–2017)
- Marcos Rogerio Secco – Fransa-Pax FC (2003–2004) East Bengal F.C. (2004–2005)
- Emerson Silva – Fransa-Pax FC (2003–2004)
- Eduardo Chacon Coelho Lacerda – Prayag United S.C. (2009–2010) Air India F.C. (2010) Southern Samity (2011–2012)
- Fábio Cortez Vidal – Churchill Brothers S.C. (2008–2009)
- Eduardo da Silva Escobar – JCT FC (2007–2009)
- Rogerio R.D. Solio – Vasco SC (1999–2000)
- Itauê Oliveira Rosa – New Delhi Heroes (2008–2009)
- Ivan Fiel da Silva – Fransa-Pax FC (2005–2008) Salgaocar S.C. (2008–2009)
- Jefferson Rocha – Vasco SC (2008–2009)
- Paulo Victor Soares – NEROCA FC (2020)
- Rui Wanderlei Weis – Vasco SC (2000–2001)
- Wellington – NorthEast United (2017)
- Wellington de Lima Gomes – NorthEast United (2016)
- Wellington Priori – NorthEast United (2016) Jamshedpur FC (2018–2019; 2022–present)
- Helder Lobato Ribeiro – TRAU FC (2020–2022)
- Carvalho Pereira – JCT Mills F.C. (2007–2008)
- Braulio Nóbrega – Bengaluru F.C. (2017–2018)
- Romario Alves – FC Kerala (2020–2021)
- Felipe Almeida De Souza – NEROCA FC (2020)
- Wagner De Carmo – NEROCA FC (2020)
- Matheus Souza Silva – Lonestar Kashmir FC (2020–2021)
- João Victor – Hyderabad FC (2020–present)
- Eliel da Cruz Guardiano – AU Rajasthan FC (2020–2021)
- Marques Marcio de Oliveira – ARA FC (2020–2021)
- Luiz Eduardo – Bhawanipore FC (2020)
- Robsõn Dos Säntos – Salgaocar S.C. (1996–1997)
- Dênis Oliveira Araujo – Bhawanipore FC (2020–2021)
- Pedro Gusmão – Kerala Blasters FC (2014)
- Bruno Volante Rodriguéz – TRAU F.C. (2021–2022)
- Ednei Jose Damasio – Mahindra United FC (2004–2005)
- Jacson Glei Da Silva – Langsning F.C. (2017–2018)
- Joao Dos Santos – Salgaocar SC (1999–2000)
- Matheus Cambuci – Churchill Brothers SC (2018–2019)
- Bruno Ramires – Bengaluru FC (2021–present)
- Ygor Catatau – Mumbai City FC (2021–2022)
- Thales Lima – TRAU FC (2021–2022)
- Cássio Gabriel – Mumbai City FC (2021–2022)
- Jonathas de Jesus – Odisha FC (2021–2022)
- Guilherme Escuro – Churchill Brothers FC (2021–2022)
- Tiago Adan Fonseca – Real Kashmir FC (2021–present)
- Douglas Santana – TRAU FC (2021–present)
- Fabiano Donato Alves – Rajasthan United FC (2021–2022)
- Fernando Gomes Júnior – TRAU FC (2021–2022)
- Marcelo Ribeiro Dos Santos – SC East Bengal (2022)
- Victor Rodrigues Santana – Kerala United FC (2022–present)
- Wesley Alex Maiolino – Muthoot FA (2022)
- Eliandro dos Santos Gonzaga – East Bengal Club (2022–2023)
- Everton Ferreira Guimarães – Gokulam Kerala FC (2022–present)

== Burkina Faso ==
- Bakary Koné – Kerala Blasters FC (2020–2021)
- Saïdou Panandétiguiri – FC Pune City (2014)
- Christian Ouedraogo – Golden Threads FC (2023–present)

== Burundi ==
- Saido Berahino – Rajasthan United (2024–present)

== Cape Verde ==
- Valmiro Lopes Rocha – Atlético de Kolkata (2015)
- Odaïr Fortes – NorthEast United FC (2017)
- Gianni dos Santos – Inter Kashi (2023–2024)

== Cameroon ==
- **Achille Emaná** – Mumbai City FC (2017–2018)
- André Bikey – NorthEast United FC (2015) FC Pune City (2016) Jamshedpur FC (2017–2018) ATK (2018–2019)
- Maxwell Ellon – Lonestar Kashmir F.C. (2019–2020)
- Aser Pierrick Dipanda – DSK Shivajians F.C. (2016) Shillong Lajong F.C. (2017) Mohun Bagan (2017–2019) Punjab F.C. (2019–2020) Real Kashmir FC (2020–2021) Aizawl FC (2021–present)
- Bong Tequwa Bertrand – Sporting Clube de Goa (2012–2013)
- Ernest Emako-Siankam – Churchill Brothers S.C. (2010)
- Calvin Mbarga – Salgaocar S.C. (2015–2016)
- Ngassa Ewane Guy Martial – East Bengal FC (2006–2007)
- Francis Ambané – Gokulam Kerala FC (2017–2018)
- Mike Djougo Foku – FC Kerala (2017–2018) Tarun Sangha Club (2020–2021) Hyderya Sports FC (2021)
- Pierre Boya – Mohun Bagan (2014–2015)
- Andre Thierry Biyikbiyik – Gangtok Himalayan SC (2016–2017)
- Raphaël Messi Bouli – Kerala Blasters FC (2019–2020)
- **Eric Djemba-Djemba** – Chennaiyin FC (2014)
- Ndem guy harvey – East Bengal F.C. (2005–2006) Mohammedan Sporting Club (2007–2008)
- Charles Edoa Nga – Shillong Lajong F.C. (2013)
- Jean Njoh – Air India F.C. (2007–2008)
- Bashiree Abbas – Air India F.C. (2003–2009) Mumbai F.C. (2009–2010)
- Aminou Bouba – Gokulam Kerala FC (2021–present)
- Christopher MacDonald – Shaheen FC (2021–2022)
- Rayden Gonzo – Eastern Railway FC (2021–2022)
- Zacharie Mbenda – Kenkre FC (2021–present)
- Romaric Bettat – Peerless SC (2021–present)
- Jacque Essombe – BASCO FC (2021–present)
- George Forbia – Don Bosco FA (2021–present)
- Guy Herman Atimele – SAT Tirur (2021–present)
- Banana Yaya – Bengaluru FC (2022–present)
- Auguste Somlaga – Gokulam Kerala FC (2022–present)

== Canada ==
- Iain Hume – Kerala Blasters FC (2014), Atlético de Kolkata (2015–2016) Kerala Blasters FC (2017–2018) FC Pune City (2018–2019)
- Imone Mohanta – Churchill Brothers SC (2009–2010)
- Tony Menezes – Mahindra United FC (2006–2007)

== Chad ==
- Azrack-Yassine Mahamat – Kerala Blasters FC (2016)
- Jules Aliba – Salgaocar S.C. (2003–2004)

== Congo ==
- Edson Dico Minga – Mahindra United FC (2007)
- Kapongo Ilunga Patient – Indian Bank Recreational Club (2017–2019)
- Prince Vinny Ibara – Bengaluru FC (2021–present)
- Thievy Bifouma – NorthEast United FC (2022)
- Dua Stanislas Ankira – Sreenidi Deccan FC (2023–present)
- Kule Mbombo – NorthEast United FC (2023–present)

== Congo DR ==
- Arnold Issoko – Mumbai City FC (2018–2019)
- Jacques Maghoma – S.C. East Bengal (2020–2021)
- Lelo Mbele – Gokulam Kerala FC (2017)
- Liswa Nduti – East Bengal F.C. (2005–2006)
- Siyo Zunapio – Churchill Brothers S.C. (2017–2018)

== Colombia ==
- Andres Gonzalez – FC Pune City (2014)
- Jairo Suárez – Chennaiyin FC (2014)
- Janeiler Rivas Palacios – NorthEast United FC (2019)
- John Mosquera – NorthEast United FC (2018)
- Jorge Caceido Rodriguez – Minerva Punjab FC (2018–2019)
- José David Leudo – NorthEast United FC (2018–2020)
- Luis Yanes – NorthEast United FC (2014)
- Omar Andrés Rodríguez – FC Pune City (2014)
- Stiven Mendoza – Chennaiyin F.C. (2014)(2015)
- Luis Alfonso Páez – North East United FC (2017–2018)
- Juan David Castañeda – Sreenidi Deccan FC (2021–present)
- Wilmar Jordán Gil – NorthEast United FC (2022–present)

== Costa Rica ==
- **Carlos Hernández** – Prayag United SC (2013–2014) Dempo S.C. (2015)
- Cristian Lagos – Churchill Brothers S.C. (2014)
- **Jhonny Acosta** – East Bengal F.C. (2018–2019) (2019–2020)
- **Michael Rodríguez** – United Sikkim FC (2012–2013)
- Yendrick Ruiz – FC Pune City (2015)
- Jonathan Moya – Hyderabad FC (2023–2024)
- Felicio Brown Forbes – East Bengal (2024–present)

== Croatia ==
- Damir Grgić – FC Pune City (2017–2018)
- Mislav Komorski – Northeast United FC (2018–2019)
- Mato Grgić – Northeast United FC (2018–2019), Mumbai City FC (2019–2020)
- Anto Pejić – Pathachakra FC (2018)
- Franjo Prce – SC East Bengal (2021–2022)
- Marko Lešković – Kerala Blasters FC (2021–present)
- Antonio Perošević – SC East Bengal (2021–2022)
- Petar Slišković – Chennaiyin FC (2022–present)

== Curaçao ==
- Guyon Fernandez – Delhi Dynamos FC (2017–2018)
- Roly Bonevacia – Sreenidi Deccan FC (2024–present)

== Cyprus ==
- Charalambos Kyriakou – East Bengal Club (2022–2023)

== Czech Republic ==
- Jakub Podaný – Atlético de Kolkata (2014)
- Pavel Eliáš – Delhi Dynamos FC (2014)
- Marek Čech – Delhi Dynamos FC (2014)
- Jan Šeda – FC Goa (2014)
- **Miroslav Slepička** – FC Goa (2014)
- Pavel Čmovš – Mumbai City FC (2014–2015)
- Tomáš Josl – NorthEast United FC (2014)
- Štrandel Petr – Mahindra United FC (2002–2003)
- Jan Štohanzl – Mumbai City FC (2014)

== Denmark ==
- Morten Skoubo – Delhi Dynamos FC (2014)
- Mads Junker – Delhi Dynamos FC (2014)
- Simon Azoulay Pedersen – Viva Kerala FC (2011)
- Michael Jakobsen – NorthEast United FC (2022–2023)
- Oliver Drost – Bengaluru FC (2024–present)

== Dominica ==
- Chad Bertrand – Sporting Clube De Goa (2010–2011)
- Kurlson Benjamin – Chirag United Kerala FC (2011–2012)

== Egypt ==
- Abdelhamid Shabana – Churchill Brothers S.C. (2013–2014)
- Fady Armanious – Sporting Clube De Goa (2018–2019)
- Omar Elhussieny – Mohun Bagan (2018–2019)
- Uzor Martin – Dempo S.C. (1998–2000)
- Alaaeldin Nasr Elmagraby – Delhi FC (2023–present)

== England ==
- Adam Le Fondre – Mumbai City FC (2020–2021)
- Bobby Hassell – Kalyani Bharat FC (2014–2015)
- Calum Angus – Pune FC (2013–2014) Dempo SC (2014–15) East Bengal F.C. (2016)
- Carl Baker – Atlético de Kolkata (2017)
- Chris Dagnall – Kerala Blasters FC (2015)
- **David James** – Kerala Blasters FC (2014)
- Gary Hooper – Kerala Blasters FC (2020–2021)
- Neil Edmonds – East Bengal F.C. (1991–1992)
- Adam Mitter – Fateh Hyderabad A.F.C. (2016–2017) Real Kashmir F.C. (2020)
- Conor Thomas – Atlético de Kolkata (2017–2018)
- Danny Seaborne – Mohun Bagan A.C. (2016)
- James Bailey – FC Pune City (2015)
- Jay Hart – Minerva Punjab F.C. (2019–2020)
- John Johnson – Bengaluru FC (2013–2018) ATK (2018–2020) Mohun Bagan SG (2020) RoundGlass Punjab (2021)
- Josh Walker – Bengaluru FC (2014–2016)
- Kallum Higginbotham – Real Kashmir FC (2019–2020)
- Marcus Willams – Kerala Blasters FC (2015)
- Nicky Shorey – FC Pune City (2015)
- Paul Rachubka – Kerala Blasters FC (2017–2018)
- Peter Ramage – Kerala Blasters FC (2015)
- Roger Johnson – FC Pune City (2015)
- Rohan Ricketts – Dempo SC (2012)
- Ryan Taylor – Atlético de Kolkata (2017–2018)
- Sanchez Watt – Kerala Blasters FC (2015)
- Stephen Bywater – Kerala Blasters FC (2015)
- Steve Simonsen – FC Pune City (2015)
- Steven Alan Prindiville – East Bengal F.C. (1990–1991)
- Tom Thorpe – Atlético de Kolkata (2017–2018)
- Michael Chopra – Kerala Blasters FC (2014) (2016)
- James Keene – Northeast United FC (2014)
- **Wes Brown** – Kerala Blasters FC (2017–2018)
- Matt Mills – FC Pune City (2018–2019)
- Raman Patrick Sisupalan – Viva Kerala FC (2009–2010)
- Peter Hartley – Jamshedpur FC (2020–2023) Inter Kashi FC (2023–2024)
- Steven Taylor – Odisha FC (2020–2021)
- Calum Woods – S.C. East Bengal (2020–2021)
- Josef Yarney – RoundGlass Punjab FC (2021–2022)
- Jay Emmanuel-Thomas – Jamshedpur FC (2022–present)
- Matt Derbyshire – NorthEast United FC (2022–2023)
- Jake Jervis – East Bengal FC (2023)
- Curtis Main – Bengaluru FC (2023–present)

== Equatorial Guinea ==
- Ivan Bolado – FC Pune City (2014)
- Lawrence Doe – Shillong Lajong F.C. (2017–2018)
- Raúl Fabiani – Pune F.C. (2013)
- Eduardo Ferreira – FC Pune City (2016), Mohun Bagan (2017–2018), East Bengal F.C. (2018), NEROCA F.C. (2018–2019)

== Ethiopia ==
- Fikru Tefera – Atlético de Kolkata (2014) Chennaiyin FC (2015) Mohammedan Sporting Club (2016)

== Fiji ==
- Gurjeet Singh – Fateh Hyderabad AFC (2016–2017)
- Roy Krishna – ATK (2019–2020) Mohun Bagan SG (2020–2022) Bengaluru FC (2022–2023) Odisha FC (2023–Present)

== Finland ==
- Joni Kauko – Mohun Bagan SG (2021–2023), Inter Kashi FC (2024–2025), Mumbai City FC (2026–Present)
- Jussi Jääskeläinen – Atlético de Kolkata (2017–2018)
- Njazi Kuqi – Atlético de Kolkata (2017–2018)
- Petteri Pennanen – Hyderabad FC (2023)

== France ==
- Bernard Mendy – Chennaiyin FC (2014–2015), East Bengal F.C. (2016), Chennaiyin FC (2016)
- Cedric Hengbart – Kerala Blasters F.C. (2014) Northeast United FC (2015) Kerala Blasters F.C. (2016)
- Claude Gnakpa – Salgaocar SC (2013)
- Christophe Jonette – TRAU F.C. (2017–2018)
- **David Trezeguet** – FC Pune City (2014)
- **Florent Malouda** – Delhi Dynamos FC (2015)
- Gennaro Bracigliano – Chennaiyin FC (2014) NorthEast United FC (2015)
- Jean-Michel Joachim – Chennai City F.C. (2017–2018) NEROCA F.C. (2018)
- Jérémy Labor – DSK Shivajians F.C. (2016)
- Johan Letzelter – Mumbai City FC (2014)
- Maxime Belouet – Salgaocar SC (2012–2013)
- **Mikael Silvestre** – Chennaiyin FC (2014)
- **Nicolas Anelka** – Mumbai City FC (2014–2015)
- Raphaël Romey – Kerala Blasters FC (2014)
- Alexandre Tabillon – Mohammedan S.C. (2015–2016) Lonestar Kashmir F.C. (2016–2017)
- **Robert Pires** – FC Goa (2014)
- Youness Bengelloun – FC Goa (2014)
- Philippe De Azevedo – Mahindra United FC (2006–2007)
- Eric Obinna Chukwunyelu – Churchill Brothers SC (2017–2018)
- Sylvain Monsoreau – Atletico de Kolkata (2014)
- Romain Philippoteaux – NorthEast United FC (2022–present)
- Jérémy Manzorro – Jamshedpur FC (2023–present)

== Gabon ==
- Henri Antchouet – Churchill Brothers S.C. (2011–2013)
- Sèrge Kevyn Aboué – Mumbai City FC (2019–2020)
- Yrondu Musavu-King – Bengaluru FC (2021–2022)

== Gambia ==
- Alpha Jallow – Prayag United S.C. (2016–2017)
- Dawda Ceesay – Churchill Brothers SC (2017–2019) Mohun Bagan (2019) Minerva Punjab F.C. (2019) Churchill Brothers SC (2019–2020) Minerva Delhi FC (2021–present)
- Saihou Jagne – Fateh Hyderabad A.F.C (2017) Shillong Lajong F.C. (2017–2018)
- Sainey Bojang – Fateh Hyderabad A.F.C (2018–2019)
- Nuha Marong Krubally – Rajasthan United FC (2022–2023)

== Germany ==
- Manuel Friedrich – Mumbai City FC (2014)
- Ville Matti Steinmann – SC East Bengal (2020–2021)
- Julius Düker – Chennaiyin FC (2022–present)

== Ghana ==
- Abednego Tetteh – Real Kashmir FC (2018–2019) TRAU FC (2019–2020)
- Augustine Okrah – Northeast United FC (2018)
- **Asamoah Gyan** – NorthEast United FC (2019–2020)
- Abu Iddrisu – East Bengal F.C. (1999–2000)
- Abel Hammond – Mumbai FC (2008–2009) East Bengal FC (2009–2010)
- Abu Siddiqui – FC Kochin (1999–2000)
- **Kwesi Appiah** – Northeast United FC (2020–2021)
- Siva Mumuni – East Bengal F.C. (2000–2001)
- Emmanuel Opoku – East Bengal F.C. (1999–2000)
- Charles Dzisah – Viva Kerala FC (2009–2011) Chirag United Kerala (2011–2012) Mohammedan S.C. (2012–2013) Kalighat Milan Sangha F.C. (2013–14)
- Charles Asamoah – Mahindra United F.C. (2004–2005)
- Baafi Jackson Kwabena – Chennai City F.C. (2017)
- Cristian Sabah – Gokulam Kerala FC (2018–2019)
- Courage Pekuson – Kerala Blasters FC (2017–2019)
- Daniel Ashley Addo – Gokulam Kerala F.C. (2017–2019)
- Arafat Haruna – Hindustan F.C. (2019–2020)
- Edmond Peprah – Fateh Hyderabad AFC (2017–2018) Peerless SC (2018–2020)
- Oscar Ahinampong – Hindustan F.C. (2020–present)
- Samuel Kane – Mohammedan S.C. (2015–2016)
- Forster Addae – Fateh Hyderabad F.C. (2018–2020)
- David Addy – Delhi Dynamos FC (2016–2017)
- David Adjei – Mahindra United FC (2006–2008)
- Jackson Egypong – East Bengal F.C. (1998–1999)
- Kennedy Ofosuhene Amponsah – East Bengal F.C. (1999–2000)
- Felix Aboagye – Mahindra United (2003–2004) East Bengal FC (2004–2005) Mumbai FC (2007–2009)
- Francis Dadzie – NorthEast United FC (2015) Sporting Clube de Goa (2016) Aizawl FC (2018)
- John Ampong – Calcutta Customs (2018–2019)
- Ishmael Addo – East Bengal FC (2008–2009)
- Collin Patterson – AU Rajasthan F.C.(2019–2020)
- James Dissiramah – Mumbai F.C. (2007–2009)
- Joseph Adjei – Aizawl F.C. (2019–2020)
- Lawrence Adjei – Sporting Clube de Goa (2008)
- Kalif Alhassan – Minerva Punjab F.C. (2019) Churchill Brothers S.C. (2019–2020)
- Adolf McCarthy – Churchill Brothers S.C. (2003–2004)
- Richard Gadze – Delhi Dynamos FC (2015–2016)
- Suley Musah – East Bengal F.C. (1997–2004, 2008–2009)
- William Opoku – Minerva Punjab FC (2017–2019)
- Yaw Amankwah Mireku – Viva Kerala FC (2007–2008)
- Yusif Yakubu – Churchill Brothers S.C. (1999–2003) Mahindra United (2004–2008) East Bengal F.C. (2008–2010) Salgaocar (2010–2011) Prayag United SC (2011–2012) Mumbai FC (2012–2014) Mohammedan S.C. (2016) Churchill Brothers S.C. (2017)
- Bashiree Mohammed Abbas – Air India F.C. (2007–2008)
- Bright Middleton Mends – Pathachakra FC (2018–2019) BSS Sporting Club (2019) Quartz F.C. (2019–2020)
- Stephen Ofei – Dempo S.C. (2012) Vasco S.C. (2013–2014)
- Abel Hammond – Mumbai F.C. (2008–2009) East Bengal F.C. (2009–2010)
- Godwin Quashiga – Fateh Hyderabad A.F.C. (2017–2018) Rainbow A.C. (2018–2019) Chhinga Veng F.C. (2019–2020)
- Samed Abdul Awudu – East Bengal F.C. (2007–2008)
- Evans Quao – Mumbai F.C. (2009–2013)
- Santa Cruz – FC Thrissur (2017–2018)
- Isaac Boakye – Chirag United Kerala F.C. (2011–2012)
- Andrew Michael Ogwuche – Golden Threads F.C. (2017–2018)
- Andrews Pomeyie Mensah – Mahindra United (2006–2008)
- Philip Mensah – Churchill Brothers S.C. (1998–1999)
- Reuben Senyo – Viva Kerala FC (2009–2010)
- Alfred Nil Larbi Darku – Viva Kerala FC (2007–2008)
- Mohamed Awal – Gokulam Kerala FC (2020–2021) Sreenidi Deccan FC (2021–present)
- Osmani Hussein – Churchill Brothers S.C. (1998–2000)
- Mohammed Fatau – Mohammedan S.C. (2020–2021)
- Abbey Wisdom – Viva Kerala FC (2007–2008)
- Dennis Antwi – Gokulam Kerala F.C. (2020–present)
- Michael George Osei – Mumbai FC (2008–2009)
- Richard Mensah – FC Bardez (2016–2018)
- Nana David – FC Kochin (2001–2002)
- Philip Adjah Tettah – Mohammedan S.C. (2018–2019) Calcutta Customs (2019) NEROCA F.C. (2019–2020) Bhawanipore F.C. (2020) Mohammedan S.C. (2020–present)
- Moses Zutah – Mohammedan S.C. (2018–2019)
- Odartey Lawson – Mahindra United FC (2003–2004)
- Charles Teiko Folley – Gokulam Kerala FC (2019–2020)
- John Ampong – Pride Sports FC (2017–2018) Calcutta Customs (2018–2019) NBP Rainbow A.C. (2019–2020)
- Willie Brown – East Bengal F.C. (1999–2000)
- Stephen Abeiku – Gokulam Kerala FC B (2018–2019) Kerala United FC (2021–present)
- Halifex Afrane – FC Kochin (2002–2003)
- Daniel Bomfa – FC Kochin (2002–2003)
- Sadat Bukari – Churchill Brothers FC (2018–2019)
- Musha Bambatelli – Guardian Angel FC (2019–2020)
- Rahim Osumanu – Gokulam Kerala FC (2021–present)
- Kwesi Sessy – Downtown Heroes FC (2021–present)
- Ben Nash Quansah – Railway FC (2021) NEROCA FC (2021–present)
- Stephan Abeiku Acquah – Parappur FC (2021–present)
- Joseph Tetteh – Golden Threads FC (2021–present)
- Obeng Kojo Forson – Real Malabar FC (2021–present)
- Bismarck Sersah – Real Malabar FC (2021–present)
- Kumi Emmanuel – Real Malabar FC (2021–present)
- Albert Omari – Techtro Swades United FC (2022–present)
- Kwame Karikari – Chennaiyin FC (2022–present)
- Nana Poku – TRAU FC (2022–present)
- Charles Offei Quarcoo – Hindustan FC (2022–present)
- Moro Lamine – Real Kashmir FC (2022–present)
- Seidu Issahak – Real Kashmir FC (2022–present)
- Ibrahim Nurudeen – Real Kashmir FC (2022–present)

== Greece ==
- **Alexandros Tzorvas** – Northeast United FC (2014)
- Panagiotis Triadis – NorthEast United FC (2019–2020)
- Ilias Pollalis – Mumbai City FC (2014)
- **Kostas Katsouranis** – FC Pune City (2014)
- Apostolos Giannou – Kerala Blasters FC (2022–present)
- Dimitrios Diamantakos – Kerala Blasters FC (2022–present)
- Dimitrios Chatziisaias – (2023–present)

== Grenada ==
- Antonio German – Kerala Blasters FC (2015–2017) Gokulam Kerala F.C. (2018–2019)
- Marcus Julien – North Imphal Sporting Association (2011–2012)

== Guam ==
- John Matkin – United Sikkim FC (2012–2013)
- Marcus Lopez – Minerva Punjab F.C. (2016)

== Guinea ==
- Florentin Pogba – Mohun Bagan SG (2022–present)
- Abdoul Karim Sylla – F.C. Kerala (2017–2018)
- Aboubacar Camara Bakia – ARA F.C. (2020–present)
- Boubacar Keita – Sporting Clube de Goa (2011–2013) Salgaocar F.C. (2016) Kenkre FC (2016–2018)
- Mandjou Keita – Salgaocar F.C. (2009–2010) Pune F.C. (2010–2012)
- Mansa Sylla – Viva Kerala FC (2008–2011)
- Sylla Karim Sulaiman – Cochin Port Trust (2016–2017)
- Souleymane Sylla – PIFA F.C. (2018–2019)
- Idrissa Sylla – NorthEast United FC (2020–present)
- Sekou Sylla – Churchill Brothers FC (2020–present)
- Sanoh Louceny Pato – Parappur FC (2021–2022)

== Guinea-Bissau ==
- Mamadu Samba Candé – Northeast United FC (2017–2018)
- Esmaël Gonçalves – Chennaiyin FC (2020–2021)

== Haiti ==
- Wedson Anselme – East Bengal F.C. (2016)
- Kervens Belfort – Kerala Blasters FC (2016) Jamshedpur FC (2017–2018)
- Frantz Bertin – Mumbai City FC (2015)
- Peterson Joseph – Sudeva Moonlight F.C. (2017)
- Jean Eudes Maurice – Chennaiyin FC (2014)
- Duckens Nazon – Kerala Blasters FC (2016)
- Sony Norde – Mohun Bagan (2014–2019) Mumbai City FC (2015–2016)
- Judelin Aveska – Mohun Bagan (2015)
- Fabien Vorbe – NEROCA F.C. (2017–2018)

== Honduras ==
- Roby Norales – Bengaluru FC (2017) Ozone FC (2017)
- Georgie Welcome – Mohun Bagan (2015)
- Clayvin Zúñiga – Churchill Brothers SC (2020–2021)
- Eddie Hernández – Mohammedan Sporting (2023–present)

== Hong Kong ==
- Ruk Bahadur – East Bengal FC (1975–1976)
- Colly Barnes Ezeh – Mohun Bagan (2000–2001)
- Eze Isiocha – Sporting Clube de Goa (2007)

== Hungary ==
- Attila Busai – NEROCA FC (2020)
- Krisztián Vadócz – FC Pune City (2014) Mumbai City FC (2016)
- Vladimir Koman Jr. – Chennaiyin FC (2021–2022)

== Iceland ==
- **Eiður Guðjohnsen** – FC Pune City (2016–2017)
- Guðjón Baldvinsson – Kerala Blasters FC (2018)

== Indonesia ==
- Beto Gonçalves – Dempo S.C. (2010)
- Muhammad Iqbal – Athletic Union Rajasthan (2019–2021)
- Gbeneme Friday – Mumbai FC (2011–2012) Shillong Lajong FC (2012–2013)

== Italy ==
- **Alessandro Nesta** – Chennaiyin FC (2014)
- Emanuele Belardi – FC Pune City (2014)
- Manuele Blasi – Chennaiyin FC (2015–2016)
- Bruno Cirillo – FC Pune City (2014)
- Davide Colomba – FC Pune City (2014)
- **Alessandro Del Piero** – Delhi Dynamos FC (2014)
- Francesco Franzese – Chennaiyin FC (2014)
- Daniele Magliocchetti – FC Pune City (2014)
- **Marco Materazzi** – Chennaiyin FC (2014)
- Mauro Boerchio – NEROCA F.C. (2018–2019), Chennai City F.C. (2019)
- Gilmar Silva Da Gonzalvez – East Bengal F.C. (2002–2003)
- Maurizio Peluso – Chennaiyin FC (2016)
- Alessandro Potenza – Chennaiyin FC (2015)
- Davide Succi – Chennaiyin FC (2016)
- Stefano Monteleon – Delhi Dynamos FC (2015)
- Mario Ferri Falco – United SC (2022)

== Iran ==
- **Ahmad Sanjari** – Mohammedan Sporting (1978)
- Mahmood Khabaji – East Bengal FC (1980–1981)
- **Majid Bishkar** – East Bengal FC (1979–1981) Mohammedan Sporting (1982–1987)
- Jamshid Nassiri – East Bengal F.C. (1980–1981) Mohammedan Sporting (1982–1985)
- Gholam Ali – East Bengal FC (1985–1986)
- Davood Hosseini – Mahindra United FC (2000–2001)
- Edison Joseph – Southern Samity (2015–2016)
- Gholam Reza – Mahindra United FC (2000–2001)
- Behnam Mohammed Reza – Air India FC (2009–2010)
- Rouhollah Samieinia – Salgaocar FC (2009–2010) Churchill Brothers SC (2010) Dempo S.C. (2011)
- Sayed Amin Mousavi – Churchill Brothers SC (2000–2001)
- Samad Naorojian – East Bengal FC (1986–1987)
- Iman Basafa – Bengaluru FC (2021–2022)
- Kamal Sayeed Ahamadi – Dempo SC (1999–2000)
- Assad Sultan – Dempo SC (1999–2000)
- Behzad Amri – Dempo S.C. (1999–2000)
- Omid Singh – East Bengal FC (2020)
- Mohammed Reza Ebrahim – Dempo S.C. (1999–2000)
- Mohammad Sanjari – Mohammedan Sporting (2009–2010)
- Vafa Hakhamaneshi – Chennaiyin FC (2022–present)
- Milad Pakparvar – Churchill Brothers FC (2022)
- Meysam Shahmakvandzadeh – Churchill Brothers FC (2023–present)

== Iraq ==
- Bassim Yonan – Churchill Brothers S.C. (1998–1999) Mohun Bagan (1999–2000)
- Hameed R. Atia – Indian Telephone Industries Limited (2000–2001)
- Majeed Odaa – Mohammedan Sporting Club (1999–2000) Indian Telephone Industries Limited (2000–2001)
- Majid Al-Nima – Dempo S.C. (1999–2000)
- Mohammed Jabbar – Mohammedan Sporting Club (1999–2000)
- Sameer Abbas – Mohammedan Sporting Club (1999–2000)

== Ivory Coast ==
- Alexander Kouame – Minerva Punjab F.C. (2018) Kalighat Milan Sangha (2019–2020)
- Arthur Kouassi – Gokulam Kerala FC (2018) Mohammedan S.C. (2019) Bhawanipore F.C. (2019)
- Abdoulaye Koffi – Shillong Lajong FC (2017–2018)
- Bazie Armand – East Bengal FC (2017–2018) Minerva Punjab FC (2018) Mohammedan S.C. (2018) Real Kashmir F.C. (2018–2020) Churchill Brothers S.C. (2020–2021) Aizawl FC (2021–present)
- Bema Coulibaly – Vasco S.C. (2017–2019) Lonestar Kashmir F.C. (2019–2020) Rangers SC Delhi (2021–present)
- **Boubacar Sanogo** – NorthEast United FC (2015)
- Bernard Yao Kouassi – Kenkre F.C. (2016–2017) Real Kashmir F.C. (2017–2018)
- Didier Kadio – Kerala Blasters F.C. (2016)
- **Didier Zokora** – FC Pune City (2015) NorthEast United FC (2016)
- Eric Dagroh – Salgaocar S.C. (2009–2010)
- Gnohere Krizo – Real Kashmir FC (2018–2020) Churchill Brothers FC (2022–present)
- Edjique Landry – Controllerate of Inspection Electronics (2016–2018)
- Guy Eric Dano – Minerva Punjab FC (2017–2018) NBP Rainbow AC (2018–2019)
- Mechac Koffi – Churchill Brothers S.C. (2018–2019)
- Kouame Konan Zacharie – Delhi United S.C. (2017–2018) Minerva Punjab FC (2018–2019)
- Ladji Saika Sylla – Delhi United S.C. (2019–2020)
- **Romaric Ndri** – NorthEast United FC (2016–2017)
- Ouattara Sie – FC Kerala (2017–2018) RFC Kochi (2018–2019) Chhinga Veng FC (2019–2020) Golden Threads FC (2021–2022)
- Gatch Arthure Diomande – Mohammedan Sporting (2011–2012) Aryan F.C. (2019–2020)
- Douhou Pierre – Mahindra United FC (2007–2009) Pune FC (2009–2014) Salgaocar FC (2015) DSK Shivajians FC (2016)
- Seidu Made – Aryan FC (2019–2020)
- Cyrille Brohiri – FC Kerala (2018–2019)
- Cheick Hamza Bamba – Hindustan FC (2017–2018) Sudeva Moonlight FC (2018–2019)
- Kamo Stéphane Bayi – George Telegraph S.C. (2016) Salgaocar S.C. (2016) Aizawl FC (2017) Mohun Bagan (2017) Gokulam Kerala F.C. (2017–2018) Tollygunge Agragami (2018) Bhawanipore F.C. (2019–2020)
- Kone Rooney Yusuf – RFC Kochi (2018–2019)
- Léonce Zikahi Dodoz – Gangtok Himalayan SC (2015–2016) Mohammedan Sporting (2016–2017) Chanmari FC (2016) Aizawl FC (2017–2019) Bhawanipore FC (2019–2020)
- Lorougnon Christ Remi – Churchill Brothers SC (2019–2020)
- Lago Dagbo Bei – Minerva Punjab FC (2017–2018)
- Lancine Touré – Mohammedan Sporting (2015–2017) Lonestar Kashmir FC (2017) Langsning SC (2017–2018) Mohammedan Sporting (2018) Minerva Punjab FC (2018–2019)
- Lassine Karamoko – Kenkre FC (2015–2016) Kalighat Milan Sangha (2019–2020)
- Moussa Ballo Finigue – Kalighat Milan Sangha (2013–2015)
- Monga Aby Samson – Mahindra United FC (2002–2004)
- Karamoko Usman – Sporting Clube De Goa (2018) Velsao SCC (2019–2020)
- Kouamé Kossonõu Junior – Vasco SC (2018–2019) Calangute Association FC (2020–2021)
- Dechanel Gnoanrou – Hyderya Sports FC (2021–2022)
- Seydou Kourouma – BSS Sporting Club (2021–2022)
- Bertie Bridji Anderson – Kochi City FC (2021–2022)
- Alassane Junior Sagara – Kochi City FC (2021–2022)
- Vakaba Kourouma – Wayanad United FC (2021–2022)
- Kilane Ebenezer Diamande – Kochi City FC (2021–2022)
- Yannick Boli – NorthEast United (2022–present)

== Jamaica ==
- Deshorn Brown – Bengaluru FC (2020–2021) NorthEast United FC (2021–2022)
- Duwayne Kerr – Chennaiyin FC (2016)
- Giles Barnes – Hyderabad FC (2019–2020)
- Jermaine Pennant – FC Pune City (2014)
- Kevaughn Frater – Bengaluru FC (2020)
- Jourdaine Fletcher – Gokulam Kerala FC (2022–present)

== Japan ==
- Anand Usuda – Inter Kashi FC (2024)
- Atsushi Yonezawa – Royal Wahingdoh FC (2013–2014) Aizawl F.C. (2015)
- Dan Ito – Churchill Brothers S.C. (2009–2011)
- Daisuke Nishiguchi – Pune FC (2012–2013) DSK Shivajians FC (2013–2014)
- Katsumi Yusa – ONGC F.C. (2011–2013), Mohun Bagan (2013–2017), NorthEast United FC (2016) East Bengal F.C. (2017–2018) NEROCA F.C. (2018–2019), Chennai City F.C. (2019–2020)
- Robert Cullen – NorthEast United FC (2016)
- Ryuji Sueoka – Mohun Bagan (2009–2010), Salgaocar SC (2010–2012), Dempo S.C. (2012–2013), East Bengal FC (2013–2014) Pune FC (2014–15)
- Ryuki Kozawa – Mumbai F.C. (2016)
- Seiya Sugishita – Sporting Clube de Goa (2012–2013)
- Shinnosuke Honda – Dempo S.C. (2013)
- Taisuke Matsugae – Shillong Lajong F.C. (2013–2014) Mumbai F.C. (2014–2016)
- Takayuki Omi – Air India FC (2011–2012)
- Taro Hasegawa – Mohammedan Sporting Club (2014–2015)
- Taiki Matsumura – Rangdajied United FC (2012–2013)
- Toshiya Hosoe – Minerva Punjab FC (2017–2018)
- Seiji Saito – Salgaocar S.C. (2013–2014)
- Yohei Iwasaki – Rangdajied United (2013–2014)
- Yugo Kobayashi – Aizawl F.C. (2017–2018)
- Yusuke Kato – Dempo S.C. (2012)
- Yusuke Yamagata – Shillong Lajong F.C. (2015–2016)
- Yuta Kinowaki – Aizawl F.C. (2015–2016) Shillong Lajong F.C. (2017) Mohun Bagan (2017–2019)
- Yu Kuboki – Minerva Punjab F.C. (2018)
- Ryoga Katsurashima – Langsning F.C. (2019–2020)
- Katsumasa Nomura – Garhwal F.C. (2019–2020)
- Shingo Nejime – Churchill Brothers S.C. (2013–2014)
- Futa Nakamura – Pathachakra FC (2018–2019)
- Yoshiaki Maruyama – Dempo S.C. (2001)
- Kento Sakurai – Langsning F.C. (2017–2018)
- Mitsuki Ichihara – United Sikkim FC (2010–2011)
- Kenji Arai – Sporting Clube De Goa (2009–2010)
- Cy Goddard – Mumbai City FC (2020–2021) Odisha FC (2023–24) Hyderabad FC (2024–present)
- Taiki Yoshida – Students Union FC (2020–2021)
- Kosuke Yamazaki Uchida – Delhi FC (2022) Sudeva Delhi FC (2022–present)
- Eisuke Mohri – Aizawl FC (2022–present)
- Akito Saito – Aizawl FC (2022–present)

== Jersey ==
- Kurtis Guthrie – RoundGlass Punjab (2021–2022)

== Jordan ==
- Bassam Al-Khatib – Mahindra United F.C. (1999–2000)
- Sameer Ahmed Jamil – Mahindra United F.C. (1999–2000)
- Ra'ed Al-Nawateer – Churchill Brothers S.C. (2013)
- Hijazi Maher – East Bengal FC (2023–present)

== Kenya ==
- Sammy Omollo – East Bengal F.C. (1996–1998) Mohun Bagan (1998–2001)
- Boniface Ambani – East Bengal F.C. (2006–2007) Sporting Clube de Goa
- Curtis Osano – Bengaluru FC (2013–2016)
- Haggi Azande Abulista – East Bengal F.C. (1997–1998)
- Harrison Muranda – Mohun Bagan (2013)
- Harold Onyango – Vasco S.C. (2003–2005)
- Julius Owino – East Bengal F.C. (2007–2009)
- Peter Opiyo Odhiambo – Viva Kerala F.C. (2009–2010)
- Zablon Amanaka – East Bengal F.C. (2006–2007)
- Moses Owira – Indian Telephone Industries Limited (1997–1998) Mohammedan Sporting Club (1998–1999) (2001)
- Nicholas Muyoti – Churchill Brothers S.C. (2006 –2007) Sporting Clube De Goa (2007–2008)
- Collins Tiego – George Telegraph S.C. (2016–2017)
- Cassious Akumu Owino – JCT Mills FC (1998–1999) FC Kochin (2001) SAIL Indian Nationals FC (2000–2002)
- William Inganga – Salgaocar S.C. (1999–2000)
- Toni Jose Oniyenga – East Bengal FC (1997–1998)
- Samuel Inawole – Salgaocar S.C. (1997–1998)

== Korea DPR ==
- Kim Seng-yong – Rangdajied United FC (2013–2014) Royal Wahingdoh FC (2015) Bengaluru FC (2015–2016) DSK Shivajians FC (2016–2017)
- Son Min-chol – Shillong Lajong FC (2012–2015) Mumbai FC (2015–2016)

== Kosovo ==
- Liridon Krasniqi – Odisha FC (2021–2022)

== Kyrgyzstan ==
- Akhlidin Israilov – NEROCA FC (2017–2018)
- Aman Talantbekov – Chennai City FC (2017–2018)
- Rustem Usanov – Air India FC (2010)
- Aleksey Drobatov – Indian Telephone Industries Limited (1999–2000)
- Bektur Talgat Uulu – Churchill Brothers SC (2017–2018) Aizawl FC (2018) NEROCA FC (2022–present)
- Ivan Filatov – Minerva Punjab FC (2017)
- Sergey Kalyubin – Indian Telephone Industries Limited (1998–1999)
- Kanatbek Mamatov – HAL SC (2001–2002)
- Ildar Amirov – East Bengal F.C. (2017) Chennai City FC (2017)
- Ruslan Sydykov – HAL SC (2001–2002), (2002–2003)
- Raja Baliev Nurlan – HAL SC (2001–2002)
- Daniel Armah Tagoe – Chennai City FC (2019)
- Daniar – HAL SC (2001–2002)
- Venyamin Shumeyko – Chennai City FC (2017–2018)
- Kiril Keker – Indian Telephone Industries (1999–2001)
- Mirlan Murzaev – Chennaiyin FC (2021–2022) Mohammedan Sporting (2022–present)
- Aydar Mambetaliev – Rajasthan United FC (2022–present)
- Bektur Amangeldiev – Rajasthan United FC (2022–present)
- Atay Dzhumashev – Rajasthan United FC (2023–present)
- Eldar Moldozhunusov – Gokulam Kerala FC (2022–present)

== Latvia ==
- Tomaskov F. Vallery – East Bengal F.C. (1996–1997)
- Sergey Kutov – East Bengal F.C. (1996–1997)

== Lebanon ==
- Akram Moghrabi – Churchill Brothers FC (2012–2013) Mohun Bagan (2018)
- Bilal El Najjarine – Churchill Brothers FC (2012–2013)
- Feiz Shamsin – Chennai City FC (2018–2019)
- Hussein El Dor – Churchill Brothers FC (2018–2019)
- Hamza Kheir – Churchill Brothers FC (2020–2021)
- Shadi Skaf – Churchill Brothers FC (2021–2022)
- Mohamad Kdouh – NEROCA FC (2020–2022) FC Bengaluru United (2022–present)
- Youssef Atriss – Rajasthan United FC (2022–present)

== Lesotho ==
- Letšepe Marabe – BASCO FC (2022–present)

== Liberia ==
- Alfred Jaryan – Mohammedan S.C (2010–2013), (2014–2015) Mumbai F.C. (2013–2014) Aizawl F.C. (2015–present) Aryan FC (2021)
- Ansumana Kromah – Churchill Brothers S.C. (2017) Mohun Bagan (2017) East Bengal F.C. (2018) Peerless SC (2018) Aizawl F.C. (2018–2019) East Bengal F.C. (2020) Bhawanipore FC (2020–present)
- Eric Brown – ONGC F.C. (2012–2013) United Sports Club (2013–2015) Pune FC (2014) Mumbai F.C. (2015–2016) United Sports Club (2017) Pathachakra (2017–2018)
- James Gbilee – Shillong Lajong F.C. (2008–2012) Kalighat Milan Sangha (2012–2014)
- Harry Moris – F.C. Kerala (2018–2019)
- Johnny Menyongar – United Sikkim FC (2011), Shillong Lajong (2011–2013), Dempo (2013), Bengaluru FC (2013–2014)
- Kallon Kiatamba – Chennai City F.C. (2017–2019)
- Pewou Bestman – FC Kochin (2000–2001)
- Sunday Seah – FC Kochin (1999–2001) Salgaocar F.C. (2001–2003) Dempo S.C. (2003–2004)
- Trokon Saykiamien – Hindustan FC (2018–2019)
- Teah Dennis Jr. – Minerva Punjab FC (2019–2020)
- Varney Kallon – Vasco S.C. (2015–2016) NEROCA F.C. (2016–2019) Peerless SC (2019–present)
- Eugene Gray – F.C. Kochin (1999–2001) Salgaocar S.C. (2001–2002) Mohammedan S.C. (2002–2003) United Sports Club (2004)
- Korhena A Boakai – Kenkre F.C. (2016–2017)
- Boima Karpeh – Churchill Brothers S.C. (2011) Pune FC (2013) Sporting Clube de Goa (2013–2015)
- Preston Corporal – Mohammedan S.C. (2006–2007)
- Alex Whittemore – Chanmari F.C. (2017–2018)
- Emile O Damey – Fateh Hyderabad A.F.C. (2018–2019)
- Vasseba Toure – Vasco S.C. (2017–2018)
- Bekay Bewar – Royal Wahingdoh F.C. (2014–2015)
- Joseph Amoah – Sporting Clube De Goa (2012–2013)
- Blamo Adolphus Mutu – RFC Kochi (2018–2019)
- Taurus Tecompleh Manneh – Oil India Limited (2013–2014) Mohammedan S.C. (2014–2015)
- Isaac Tondo – F.C. Kochin (1999–2000)
- Aaron Cole – FC Kochin (2001–2001)
- Glador Oscar Zaire – Salgaocar S.C. (2001–2002)
- Josiah Seton – F.C. Kochin (2001–2002)
- Philip Karnga – F.C. Kochin (2001–2002)
- Raymond Sancho – Salgaocar S.C. (2003–2004)
- Martyn – Indian Telephone Industries Limited (2003–2004)
- Theodore Sunday Wrobeh – Prayag United S.C. (2006–2008) Mohammedan S.C. (2008–2011)
- Philip Tarlue – FC Kochin (2003–2004) HAL SC (2004) J&K Bank Football Club (2004–2005)
- Perry Kollie – Royal Wahingdoh FC (2011–2012)
- Williams Rashidi – FC Kochin (2000–2001)
- Melvin Tarley – DSK Shivajians FC (2013)
- Patrick Nuku Granue – FC Kochin (2000–2002)
- Godwin Abu Baker – Mohammedan S.C. (2003)
- Kelvin Kollie – Kashmir Avengers FC (2021) Railway FC (2021)
- Benjamin Sackor – Aryan FC (2021)
- Alloy Brown – Calcutta Customs (2021–2022)
- Abubakar Dunnoh – Wayanad United FC (2022–present)
- Alvin Jeh Teah – Parappur FC (2022–present)

== Lithuania ==
- Nerijus Valskis – Chennaiyin FC (2019–2020) Jamshedpur FC (2020–2021) Chennaiyin FC (2021–2022)
- Fedor Černych – Kerala Blasters FC (2023–present)
- Nauris Petkevičius – Inter Kashi (2025-present)

== Macau ==
- Gilmar Tadeu da Silva – Mahindra United FC (2001–2002)
- José Maria da Cruz Martins – Vasco SC (1997–1998) Churchill Brothers S.C. (1998–1999)

== Malawi ==
- Young Chimodzi Jr – Kenkre FC (2014–2015)

== Malaysia ==
- Stanley Bernard Samuel – Sporting Clube de Goa (2010–2011)

== Maldives ==
- Ali Ashfaq – Minerva Punjab FC (2019)

== Mali ==
- Abdoulaye Kanouté – Aizawl F.C. (2019–2020)
- Boubacar Diarra – NEROCA F.C. (2019–2020)
- Dramane Traoré – FC Pune City (2016)
- Mohamed Sissoko – FC Pune City (2016)
- Amadou Alou Sissoko – Aizawl F.C. (2019–2020)
- Ousmane Diawara – NEROCA F.C. (2019–2020)
- Ibrahim Sylla – Madhya Bharat S.C. (2018–2020)
- Saliou Guindo – Gokulam Kerala F.C. (2020)
- Minkael Sylla – Bengaluru Young Challengers (2021–2022)

== Malta ==
- André Schembri – Chennaiyin FC (2019–2020)

== Martinique ==
- Grégory Arnolin – FC Goa (2014–2016)
- Frédéric Piquionne – Mumbai City FC (2015)
- Mathias Coureur – NorthEast United FC (2021–2022)
- Sylvain Monsoreau – Atletico de Kolkata (2014–2015)
- Sébastien Carole – NISA Manipur F.C. (2010)

== Mauritius ==
- Sewram Gobin – Mohun Bagan (2007–2008) Pune F.C. (2009–2010)

== Mauritania ==
- Khassa Camara – NorthEast United FC (2020–2021) Hyderabad FC (2022)–2025)

== Mexico ==
- Aníbal Zurdo Rodríguez – FC Pune City (2016)
- Enrique Esqueda – East Bengal F.C. (2018–2019)
- Gustavö Godinéz – Delhi Dynamos F.C. (2015)
- David Izazola Ramírez – Churchill Brothers SC (2018)
- Ulises Dávila – Delhi Dynamos F.C. (2019)

== Moldova ==
- Petru Leucă – TRAU F.C. (2020)

== Montenegro ==
- Andjelo Rudović – Mohammedan Sporting (2021–2022)
- Darko Nikač – Pune FC (2015)
- Slavko Damjanović – Chennaiyin FC (2021–2022) Mohun Bagan SG (2022–present)
- Vladan Kordić – Gokulam Kerala FC (2022)

== Morocco ==
- Ahmed Gazi – Meghe United Nagpur (2012–2013)
- Ahmed Jahouh – FC Goa (2017–2020) Mumbai City F.C. (2020–2023), Odisha FC (2023–2025)
- Domi Berlanga – Inter Kashi FC (2024–2025)
- Faisal Daif – Meghe United Nagpur (2012–2013)
- Hugo Boumous – FC Goa (2018–2020) Mumbai City FC (2020–2021) Mohun Bagan SG (2021–2024) Odisha FC (2024 – present)
- Karim Jaouhari – Mohun Bagan (2008–2009)
- Mohammed Ali Bemammer – NorthEast United FC (2023–2025), Chennaiyin FC (2026–Present)
- Noah Sadaoui – FC Goa (2022–2024), Kerala Blasters FC (2024–Present)
- Noussair El Maimouni – ATK (2018)
- Younes Baltham – Mohammedan S.C. (2012–2014)
- Zaid Krouch – FC Goa (2019)

Alaeddine Ajaraie Northeast United Fc [2024–present]

== Mozambique ==
- Eze Collins Pedro – Kenkre FC (2010) Delhi United S.C. (2013–2017)
- Rogério Issufo – Madhya Bharat SC (2017) Pride Sports FC (2018–2019)
- Lúis Vidal Chissano – Gangtok Himalayan SC (2016–2017) Kenkre FC (2021–present)

== Myanmar ==
- Fred Pugsley – East Bengal FC (1942–1945)

== Namibia ==
- Alfred Ndyenge – Southern Samity (2011–2012)
- Quinton Jacobs – United Sikkim FC (2011–2012) Salgaocar SC (2012) Mohun Bagan (2012–2013)
- Richard Gariseb – Bhawanipore F.C. (2012–2013), (2014)

== Nepal ==
- Abhishek Rijal – Mohammedan Sporting Club (2020–2021) NEROCA FC (2021)
- Anil Gurung – Shillong Lajong FC (2009–2010)
- Ananta Tamang – Churchill Brothers SC (2020) East Bengal F.C. (2022)
- Amatya Bahadur – Mahindra United FC (1999)
- Bimal Gharti Magar – Mohun Bagan (2018) Chhinga Veng FC (2018–2019)
- Bal Gopal Maharjan – Mahindra United FC (2001–2002)
- Dev Narayan Thapa – East Bengal F.C. (1995–1996)
- Ganesh Thapa – East Bengal F.C. (1983–1984)
- Hari Khadka – Tollygunge Agragami (1996–1997) Kerala Police FC (1997–1998) Mahindra United (2000–2001) Mohun Bagan (2001–2002)
- Kiran Chemjong – Minerva Punjab FC (2017–2018) (2019–20) Punjab FC (2020–2021) (2022 – present)
- Kamal Thapa – Pune F.C. (2007–2008) ONGC F.C. (2008–2010)
- Yogesh Gurung – Gangtok Himalayan SC (2016–2017)
- Palsang Lama – Tollygunge Agragami F.C. (2016) United Sikkim F.C. (2012–2013) Minerva Punjab FC (2017)
- Devnarayan Chaudhury – Mohammedan Sporting Club (2000–2001)
- Mani Bikram Shah – Mohammedan Sporting Club (1987–1989)
- Prakash Budhathoki – NEROCA F.C. (2020–2021)
- Rajesh Pariyar – ARA FC (2019–2020)
- Rohit Chand – HAL SC (2010–2012)
- Shyam Babu Kyapchhali – Bhawanipore FC (2018–2019) Mohammedan Sporting Club (2019–2020)
- Narendra Man Singh – Mafatlal Group S.C. (1982–1986) Mahindra United FC (1985–1989)
- Sandip Rai – Mohammedan Sporting Club (2010–2011)
- Bharat Khawas – Pune F.C. (2012)
- Ashim Jung Karki – Royal Wahingdoh FC (2013–2014)
- Upendra Man Singh – Salgaocar SC (1998–1999)
- Bijaya Gurung – Mahindra United FC (2005)
- Sujal Shrestha – Gangtok Himalayan SC (2011)
- Nar Bahadur Thapa – Indian Telephone Industries Limited (1999–2000) Bengal Mumbai FC (2000–2001)
- Omahang Limboo – Madan Maharaj FC (2021–2022)
- Nischal Rokka – Youngsters Club Chandigarh (2018–2019)
- Managya Nakarmi – Kidderpore SC (2022)
- Kamal Shrestha – Gorkha FC Arunachal (2022)
- Kuldip Karki – Railway FC Calcutta (2022–2023)
- Anjan Bista – Mumbai Kenkre (2023–present)

== Netherlands ==
- Bas van den Brink – Churchill Brothers S.C. (2013)
- Darren Sidoel – SC East Bengal (2021–present)
- Gianni Zuiverloon – Delhi Dynamos (2018–2019) Kerala Blasters F.C. (2019–2020)
- Gregory Nelson – Chennaiyin FC (2017–2019)
- Hans Mulder – Delhi Dynamos FC (2014–2015) Chennaiyin FC (2016)
- Jeroen Lumu – Delhi Dynamos (2017–2018)
- John Goossens – FC Pune City (2014)
- Kai Heerings – NorthEast United FC (2019–2020)
- Luc Wulterkens – DSK Shivajians F.C. (2015–2016)
- Mark Sifneos – Kerala Blasters F.C. (2017–2018) FC Goa (2018)
- Riga Mustapha – Pune FC (2013–2014)
- Serginho Greene – Delhi Dynamos FC (2015)
- Stijn Houben – Delhi Dynamos FC (2014)
- Wesley Verhoek – FC Pune City (2015)
- Abdenasser El Khayati – Chennaiyin FC (2022–present)

== New Caledonia ==
- Jaushua Sotirio – Kerala Blasters FC (2023–2025)

== New Zealand ==
- **Kris William Bright** – Kalyani Bharat FC (2014–2015)
- Kayne Vincent – Mumbai F.C. (2009–2010) Churchill Brothers S.C. (2010–2011) Prayag United SC (2011–2013)
- **Leo Bertos** – Northeast United FC (2014) East Bengal F.C. (2014–2015)

== Niger ==
- Akabougu Chimezie – Golden Threads F.C. (2017–2018)
- Koffi Dan Kowa – Sporting Clube de Goa (2014–2015)
- Joseph Olaniran – Calcutta Customs (2017–2018)
- Yusuf Ahmed Ibrahim – Air India F.C. (2010–2011)
- Abdoul Aziz – Wayanad United FC (2022–present)
- Yacouba Aboubacar – United Sports Club (2022–present)

== Nigeria ==
- Alao Fatai Adisa – Vasco S.C. (2013–2014) Mohun Bagan (2014)
- Charles Apu – East Bengal F.C. (1985–1986)
- Amos Omeje – Air India FC (2013)
- Anyichie Echezona – Southern Samity (2011–2012) Mohun Bagan (2012–2014) Royal Wahingdoh FC (2014–2017) Chennai City F.C. (2017) Mohammedan S.C. (2018) George Telegraph S.C. (2018–2019)
- **Emeka Ezeugo** – East Bengal F.C. (1986–1987) Mohammedan S.C. (1989–1990) Mohun Bagan (1997) Churchill Brothers SC (1997–1998)
- Badmus Babatunde – Viva Kerala FC (2006–2009) Salgaocar S.C. (2007) ONGC F.C. (2010–2012) Rangdajied United FC (2012–2013) Royal Wahingdoh FC (2013–2014) Gangtok Himalayan S.C. (2015–2016) Chennai United FC (2016–2017)
- Bala Dahir – Garhwal FC (2014–2015) FC Kerala (2017–2018) Minerva Punjab F.C. (2015–2016) (2018–2019) Garhwal FC (2019–2020) Luca SC (2021–present)
- **Bartholomew Ogbeche** – Northeast United FC (2018–2019), Kerala Blasters F.C. (2019–present), Mumbai City FC (2020–2021), Hyderabad FC (2021–present)
- Bello Razaq – Viva Kerala FC (2008–2010) United SC (2011–2014) Mohun Bagan (2015) East Bengal F.C. (2015–16) Prayag United S.C. (2016) Gokulam Kerala FC (2017)
- Nathaniel Amos – Sporting Clube de Goa (2008–2010) Salgaocar S.C. (2011–2012)
- Chidi Edeh – Dempo S.C. (2007–2008), Mahindra United (2008–2009), Mohun Bagan (2009–2011), Salgaocar SC (2011–2012), East Bengal F.C. (2012–2014)
- Michael Bassey – Shillong Lajong F.C. (2008)
- Chika Wali – Pune FC (2007–2010) Prayag United S.C. (2010–2011) Pune FC (2011–2013) Salgaocar S.C. (2013–2014) Mumbai F.C. (2014–15) Dempo S.C. (2015–2016) Ozone F.C. (2016–2017)
- Christopher Chizoba – Shillong Lajong F.C. (2011–2012) Mohun Bagan (2013–2014) Lonestar Kashmir F.C. (2015–2016)
- Emmanuel Ini Oyoh – Guwahati FC (2019–2020)
- Daniel Odafin – Shillong Lajong F.C. (2017–2018)
- David Opara – Air India FC (2009–2010) ONGC F.C. (2010–2011) Churchill Brothers S.C. (2011–2012) Mumbai FC (2012–2013) Tuff Laxmi Prasad (2014–2015)
- David Sunday – Chirag United Kerala F.C. (2011–2012) Mohammedan S.C. (2012)
- Donatus Edafe – Minerva Punjab F.C. (2018)
- Dudu Omagbemi – Salgaocar S.C. (2014) East Bengal F.C. (2014–2015) FC Goa (2015) Chennaiyin F.C. (2016) East Bengal F.C. (2017–2018)
- Sunday Ambrose – JCT F.C. (2007–2008)
- Anoure Obiora – Sporting Clube de Goa (2008)
- Ebi Sukore – Mumbai FC (2011–2012) (2014) Shillong Lajong F.C. (2012–2013)
- Echezona Anyichie – Southern Samity (2011–2012) Mohun Bagan (2012–2014) Royal Wahingdoh (2014–2017) Chennai City F.C. (2017) Mohammedan S.C. (2018) George Telegraph (2018–2020)
- Emmanual Ejiogu – Hindustan Aeronautics Limited (2012–2013) Vasco SC (2014–2015) Techno Aryan (2018–2019) Gokulam Kerala F.C. (2019)
- Ekene Ikenwa – Salgaocar S.C. (2009–2010) (2010–2011) East Bengal F.C. (2010)
- Emmanuel Chigozie – Aizawl F.C. (2016) Gokulam Kerala F.C. (2017–2018) Aryan FC (2018–2019)
- Felix Chidi Odili – Vasco SC (2012) Josco FC (2013) Eagles FC (2014) Calangute Association (2014–2015) Dempo S.C. (2016) NEROCA F.C. (2016–2019)
- Felix Chimaokwu – Churchill Brothers S.C. (2006–2010) Viva Kerala (2010–2011) Mohammedan S.C. (2011–2012)
- Fredrick Okwagbe – Hindustan Aeronautics Limited FC (2005–2007)
- Gbeneme Friday – Mumbai FC (2011–2012) Shillong Lajong F.C. (2012–2013)
- Hammed Adesope – Churchill Brothers S.C. (2013)
- Henry Ezeh – Mumbai FC (2010–2011) Air India FC (2011–2013) Vasco S.C. (2019–present)
- Hassan Odeola – ONGC F.C. (2012–2013)
- Humphrey Zebba – East Bengal FC (1997–1998)
- Izu Azuka – Jamshedpur FC (2017–2018)
- Jagaba Hamza – HAL S.C. (2011–2012) Salgaocar S.C. (2012–2013)
- Joel Sunday – Aizawl F.C. (2016) Gokulam Kerala FC (2018–2019) TRAU F.C. (2020–2020)
- John Chidi Uzodinma – TRAU FC (2019) Mohammedan S.C. (2019–2020) BSS Sporting Club (2020–2021) Mohammedan S.C. (2021–present)
- Jude Nworuh – Chennaiyin FC (2017–2018)
- Julius Akpele – Salgaocar S.C. (2006–2007) East Bengal F.C. (2009–2010)
- Junior Obagbemiro – Sporting Clube de Goa (2008–2010) Chirag United (2010–2011) Salgaocar S.C. (2011–2012) Air India FC (2012–2013)
- **Kalu Uche** – FC Pune City (2015) Delhi Dynamos FC (2017–2018) ATK (2018–2019)
- Kareem Omolaja – Jammu & Kashmir Bank (2009–2010) JCT Mills F.C. (2010–2011) Royal Wahingdoh FC (2011–2013) Southern Samity (2013–2015) FC Green Valley (2014) Lonestar Kashmir FC (2015) Morning Star FC (2015) Mohammedan Sporting (2015) Minerva Punjab F.C. (2016–2017) Tollygunge Agragami FC (2016) Aizawl F.C. (2017–2019) Minerva Punjab FC (2019) Mohammedan Sporting (2019)
- Kelechi Okoye – Shillong Lajong FC (2010–2011) Rangdajied United FC (2011–2013)
- Kingsley Obumneme – Aizawl F.C. (2017) Mohun Bagan (2017–2019) Minerva Punjab F.C. (2020–2020)
- Koko Sakibo – Vasco SC (2009–2011) Dempo S.C. (2011–2013) Eagles FC (2013–2014) Tollygunge Agragami FC (2014–2015) FC Bardez Goa (2017)
- Loveday Enyinnaya – Rangdajied United FC (2011–2014) Royal Wahingdoh (2014–2015) Sporting Clube de Goa (2016) Minerva Punjab FC (2017) Real Kashmir F.C. (2018–2020)
- Michael Lucky Kelechuckwu – FC Green Valley (2015–2016) Viva Chennai (2016–2017) Chennai City FC (2017)
- Muisi Ajao – East Bengal F.C. (2005–2006)
- Mohammed Gambo – East Bengal F.C. (2018)
- Monday Osagie – Churchill Brothers SC (2017–2018)
- Muritala Ali – Chirag United SC (2008–2009), Mahindra United (2009–2010), Mohun Bagan (2010–2011), ONGC F.C. (2011–2013)
- Nathaniel Amos – Sporting Clube de Goa (2007)
- Ndidi Chukwuma – Sporting Clube de Goa (2015–2016)
- Odafa Okolie – Mohammedan S.C. (2003–2004) Churchill Brothers S.C. (2005–2011) Mohun Bagan (2011–2014) Churchill Brothers SC (2014–2015) Sporting Clube de Goa (2015–2016) Gokulam Kerala F.C. (2018)
- Ogba Kalu Nnanna – Churchill Brothers S.C. (2007–2010) Dempo S.C. (2010–2011), Sporting Clube de Goa (2011–2014) Churchill Brothers SC (2017–2018)
- Oguchi Uche – TRAU F.C. (2019–2020)
- Ojimi Obatola – Salgaocar S.C. (2013)
- Oluwaunmi Somide – Gokulam FC (2017–2018)
- Orok Essien – Kenkre FC (2011–2012) George Telegraph S.C. (2012–2013) Mumbai F.C. (2013) East Bengal F.C. (2014–2015) Morning Star FC (2015–2016) Viva Chennai (2016) Bhawanipore FC (2016–2017) Minerva Punjab FC (2019) Aryan FC (2020–2021)
- Penn Orji – East Bengal F.C. (2010–2013) Mohammedan Sporting Club (2013–2014) Kerala Blasters F.C. (2014) Shillong Lajong F.C. (2015–2016)
- Peter Omoduemuke – Churchill Brothers (2017)
- Philip Njoku – Minerva Punjab F.C. (2018–2019)
- Ranti Martins – Dempo S.C. (2004–2012) United Sports Club (2012–2014) Rangdajied United F.C. (2014) East Bengal F.C. (2014–2016)
- Victor Amobi – Minerva Punjab FC (2017) Forward Club Tripura (2019–2020)
- Uga Okpara – East Bengal F.C. (2009–2014) Tollygunge Agragami F.C. (2014–2015)
- Dolphine Bernard – Mohammedan S.C. (2015–2016)
- Justice Morgan – Chennai City FC (2016–2017) George Telegraph S.C. (2018–2020) Aizawl F.C. (2013–2016) (2020–2020)
- Kingsley Chukwu Chioma – Mumbai F.C. (2011)
- Joseph Olaleye – TRAU F.C. (2019–2020)
- Majekodunmi Bolaji – Dempo S.C. (2006–2007) East Bengal FC (2007–2008)
- Michael Segum Tayo – Sporting Clube De Goa (2008–2009) Air India FC (2009–2010) Southern Samity (2011–2012)
- Beili Nurien – East Bengal FC (1997–1998)
- Oneyama Eke – ONGC F.C. (2012–2013)
- Gbenga Lawal Abiodun – Salgaocar S.C. (1999–2000)
- Ekomobong Victor Philip – Kenkre F.C. (2018) Garhwal F.C. (2019–2020)
- Eric Obinna Chukwunyelu – Churchill Brothers S.C. (2017–2018)
- Adebayo Gbadebo – Mohun Bagan (1999–2000)
- Henry Okara – Dempo S.C. (1998–1999)
- Friday Elaho – F.C. Kochin (1994–19995) Mohun Bagan (1998–1999)
- Louis Nigi Ebami – Chirag United FC (2008–2009)
- Waheed Adekunle – George Telegraph S.C. (2013–2014) Prayag United (2014) Ramhlun North FC (2018–2019)
- Abeeku Gaiesi – East Bengal FC (2007–2008)
- Stephen Eze – Jamshedpur FC (2020–2021)
- Henry Chukwukei – Mohammedan S.C. (2004–2005)
- Yusuf Ibrahim – Mumbai FC (2007–2008) Air India FC (2009–2011)
- Godwin Ogambah Pepehlyne – Bengal Mumbai FC (2000–2001)
- Egware Charles Efemena – Simla Youngs FC (2009) Calcutta Port Trust (2010) Aryan FC (2011–2012) Sporting Clube De Goa (2016)
- Benson Oladetan – Bengal Mumbai FC (2007–2008)
- Adebayo Gbadebo – Mohun Bagan (1998–1999)
- Jallaluddin Farid – East Bengal FC (1994–1995)
- Lukman Adefemi – Real Kashmir F.C. (2020–present)
- Nnabuike Praise – Air India FC (2011)
- Onyeama Okechukwu – Tezpur United FC (2012–2013) Southern Samity (2014) Laxmi Prasad S.C. (2015) Eagles FC (2016) Churchill Brothers S.C. (2017–2018)
- Obasi Moses Louis – Aryan FC (2015–2016)
- Bright Enobakhare – S.C. East Bengal (2020–2021)
- Stephen Harry – George Telegraph S.C. (2018) Mohammedan S.C. (2018–2019)
- Adeshin Sadiq – Bengal Mumbai FC (2002–2003)
- Valentine Euzengo – Salgaocar S.C. (1997–1999) Vasco SC (1999–2000)
- Ernest Jeremiah – East Bengal FC (2004–2005)
- Ibe Ikechukwu Gift – East Bengal FC (2007–2008)
- Habib Adenkule – Salgaocar SC (1998–1999) Vasco S.C. (1999–2000)
- Sherifdeen Adenekan – Salgaocar SC (1998–1999) Tollygunge Agragami FC (1999–2000)
- Salau Nuruddin – Tollygunge Agragami FC (2011–2013) FC Green Valley (2012) United Sikkim F.C. (2012–2013) Prayag United (2014) Mohammedan S.C. (2015–2016) Pathachakra FC (2017–2018)
- Emeka Achilefu – JCT Mills FC (1997–1998) Bengal Mumbai FC (1998–1999) Mohun Bagan (1999–2000)
- Mike Okoro – East Bengal F.C. (2002–2004)
- Monda Adams – Bengal Mumbai FC (2000–2001)
- Princewill Emeka – NEROCA F.C. (2016) TRAU F.C. (2017–2018) Mohammedan S.C. (2018–2019) TRAU FC (2019–2020) Aizawl F.C. (2020–2021)
- Bolane Kazeem Amobi – George Telegraph S.C. (2015–2016) Aryan FC (2016–2017)
- Stanley Okoroigwe – Aryan FC (2010) Mohammedan S.C. (2011–2012) Mohun Bagan (2012–2013) George Telegraph S.C. (2013–2014)
- Raphael Onwrebe – Mohammedan S.C. (2020–2021)
- Chukwudi Chukwuma – SESA FC Goa (2012–2013)
- Bisiriyu Adowake Fatai – Indian Bank Recreational Club (1998–1999)
- Emmanuel Ini Oyoh – Guwahati FC (2015–2016)
- Sunday Chizoba Nwadialu – Churchill Brothers S.C. (2014–2015)
- Anorue Obiora Richard – Sporting Clube de Goa (2011–2012)
- Peter Omoduemuke – Churchill Brothers FC (2017–2018)
- Johnny Akujebi – East Bengal F.C. (1987–1988)
- Daniel Chima Chukwu – SC East Bengal (2021–2022) Jamshedpur FC (2022–present)
- Remi Martins – Hindustan FC (2017–2018)
- Harrison Chukwuji – Samaleswari SC (2012–2013)
- Chisom Chikatara – Gokulam Kerala FC (2021–2022)
- Kenneth Ikechukwu – Churchill Brothers (2021–present)
- Agwu Somtochukwu Richard – Southern Samity (2017) Tollygunge Agragami (2018–2019) Rainbow AC (2019–2020) Peerless SC (2020–2021)
- Francis Nwankwo – Kerala United FC (2021–present)
- Richard Agwu Somtochukwu – Shirsh Bihar United FC (2021)
- Nwalioba Alexander Uderica – FC Kerala (2021–present)
- Emmanuel Jeremiah Ohja – Gokulam Kerala Reserves (2021–present)
- Ogana Ugochukwu Louis – Sreenidi Deccan FC (2022–present)
- Abiola Dauda – Mohammedan Sporting (2022–present)
- Sylvester Igboun – NorthEast United FC (2022)
- Valentine Nwabili – FC Agniputhra (2022–present)
- Abayomi Oludeyi – Garhwal Heroes FC (2022) FC Kerala (2022–present)

== Northern Ireland ==
- Aaron Hughes – Kerala Blasters F.C. (2016)
- Martin Paterson – ATK (2018)

== North Macedonia ==
- Hristijan Denkovski – Gokulam Kerala F.C. (2018)
- Vlatko Drobarov – Kerala Blasters FC (2019–2020)

== Norway ==
- John Arne Riise – Delhi Dynamos FC (2015) Chennaiyin FC (2016–2017)
- Kristian Opseth – Bengaluru F.C. (2020–2021)

== Pakistan ==
- Abdul Hamid – Mohun Bagan (1933–1935)
- Rashid Khan – Mohammedan Sporting (1932–1947)
- Hafiz Rashid – Mohammedan Sporting (1933–1947)
- Kalu Khan – Mohammedan Sporting (1933–1947)
- Mohammad Yasin – Mohammedan Sporting (1933–1947)
- Aquil Ahmed – Mohammedan Sporting (1934–1936)
- Jumma Khan – Mohammedan Sporting (1934–1944)
- Osman Jan – Mohammedan Sporting (1935–1939) Aryan FC (1930s) West Bengal (1941–1942) Delhi (1944–1945)
- Muhammad Ramzan Sr. – Mohammedan Sporting (1950s)
- A. Hannan – Mohammedan Sporting (1940s)
- H. Hassan – Mohammedan Sporting (1950s)
- Ismail Jan – Bhawanipore (1930s) Mohammedan Sporting (1940s)
- A. Samad Jr. – Mohammedan Sporting
- Bachi Khan – Mohammedan Sporting (1935–1940s)
- Taj Mohammad Sr. – Mohammedan Sporting (1940–1947) East Bengal FC (1949)
- Jumma Khan Jr. – Mohammedan Sporting (1939–1942)
- Hussain Killer – East Bengal (1956–1960)
- Ghulam Muhammad – Mohammedan Sporting (1950s)
- Dad Muhammad – Mohammedan Sporting (1950s)
- Fazalur Rehman – Mohammedan Sporting (1946, 1951–1954)
- Masood Fakhri – East Bengal (1952–1954) Mohammedan Sporting (1955–1956)
- Ibrar Hussain Bali – Mohammedan Sporting (1950s)
- Zakaullah – Mohammedan Sporting (1950s)
- Nurul Hassan – Mohammedan Sporting (1950s)
- Iqbal – Mohammedan Sporting (1950s)
- Riasat Ali – East Bengal (1952)
- Niaz Ali – East Bengal (1953)
- F. R. Khan – East Bengal (1953–1954)
- Jamil Akhtar – East Bengal (1954)
- Mohammad Ghazi – East Bengal (1954)
- Muhammad Qasim – East Bengal (1954)
- Sumbal Khan – East Bengal (1955)
- Abdul Haq – East Bengal (1955)
- Abid Hussain Ghazi – Mohammedan Sporting (1956, 1960)
- Moosa Ghazi – East Bengal (1956–1958) Mohammedan Sporting (1959–1961)
- Muhammad Umer – Mohammedan Sporting (1956–1960)
- Abdul Ghafoor – Mohammedan Sporting (1960)
- Adil Nabi – Delhi Dynamos FC (2015)
- Samir Nabi – Delhi Dynamos FC (2016–2017)
- Kashif Siddiqi – Real Kashmir FC (2019–2020)

== Palestine ==
- Carlos Salom – Chennaiyin FC (2018–2019)
- Omar Jarun – Kalyani Bharat F.C. (2015)
- Yaser Hamed – NorthEast United FC (2023–2024)

== Panama ==
- Ronaldo Dinolis – Gokulam Kerala F.C. (2016)
- Rogelio Juárez – Lonestar Kashmir FC (2021) Corbett FC (2021–present)

== Paraguay ==
- Enzo Prono – Aizawl FC (2018)

== Philippines ==
- Ángel Guirado – Salgaocar F.C. (2012)
- Álvaro Alonso – Quartz FC Calicut (2016–2017)

== Poland ==
- Ariel Borysiuk – Chennaiyin FC (2021–2022)
- Łukasz Gikiewicz – Chennaiyin FC (2021–2022)
- Martins Ekwueme – Sporting Clube de Goa (2013–2014)

== Portugal ==
- Eurípedes Amoreirinha – Churchill Brothers S.C. (2013)
- Filipe Azevedo – Mahindra United FC (2006–2007)
- João Coimbra – Kerala Blasters FC (2015)
- Henrique Dinis – Delhi Dynamos FC (2014)
- Miguel Garcia – NorthEast United FC (2014) Sporting Clube de Goa (2015) NorthEast United FC (2015)
- Jose Goncalves – NorthEast United (2017–2018)
- Miguel Herlein – FC Goa (2014)
- Edinho Júnior – Shillong Lajong F.C. (2013)
- Hugo Machado – Churchill Brothers S.C. (2013)
- Edgar Marcelino – FC Goa (2014) Pune FC (2015)
- Bruno Pinheiro – FC Goa (2014) (2017–2018)
- **Hélder Postiga** – Atlético de Kolkata (2015–2016)
- André Preto – Mumbai City FC (2014)
- Tiago Ribeiro – Mumbai City FC (2014)
- **Simão Sabrosa** – NorthEast United FC (2015)
- Luis Carlos Nogueira Santos – Fateh Hyderabad A.F.C. (2016–2017)
- Henrique Sereno – Atlético de Kolkata (2016) Chennaiyin FC (2017–2018)
- Hélio Pinto – NorthEast United FC (2018)
- Silas – NorthEast United FC (2015)
- José Soares – Salgaocar S.C. (2008)
- Zequinha – Atlético de Kolkata (2017–2018)
- Paulo Machado – Mumbai City FC (2018–2020)
- Sócrates Pedro – Churchill Brothers S.C. (2020)
- Jose Martin – Churchill Brothers S.C. (1998–1999)
- Hilário Leal – Vasco S.C. (1999–2000)
- Luís Machado – NorthEast United FC (2020–2021)
- Elinton Andrade – FC Goa (2015)
- Dennis Cabral – Salgaocar S.C. (1998–1999) Vasco SC (2000–2001)
- Bruno Anciães – Kenkre FC (2013)
- Domingos Jesus Gomes Lopes – Kenkre FC (2012–2013)
- Rodilson Felisberto Dias – Kenkre FC (2013–2014)
- Gabriel Orphão Dos Anjos – Rebels FC Bangalore (2018–2019)

== Puerto Rico ==
- Sidney Adam Rivera – Chennaiyin F.C. (2018)

== Republic of Ireland ==
- Anthony Pilkington – SC East Bengal (2020–2021)
- Billy Osman Mehmet – Dempo S.C. (2013)
- John Devine (footballer, born 1958) – East Bengal F.C. (1987–1998)
- Andy Keogh – NorthEast United FC (2020)
- Michael Collins – Bengaluru FC (2016)
- Carl McHugh – ATK (2019) Mohun Bagan SG (2020–present)
- Colin Falvey – Kerala Blasters FC (2014)
- **Robbie Keane** – Atlético de Kolkata (2017–2018)
- Shane McFaul – DSK Shivajians F.C. (2016–2017)
- Darren O'Dea – Mumbai City FC (2015)
- Graham Stack – Kerala Blasters FC (2016)

== Romania ==
- Andrei Ionescu – Aizawl F.C. (2017–2018)
- **Adrian Mutu** – FC Pune City (2015)
- Dan Ignat – Shillong Lajong F.C. (2017)
- Dragoș Firțulescu – Chennaiyin FC (2019–2020)
- Lucian Goian – Mumbai City (2016–2019) Chennaiyin F.C. (2019–2020)

== Russia ==
- Sergei Vladimirovich Markin – Mohun Bagan (1994)
- Vallery Igoroviç – Mohun Bagan (1996)
- Sergey Andreev – Dempo S.C. (2001–2002)
- Evgeny Kozlov – Mohammdan Sporting (2023–present)

== Rwanda ==
- Atuheire Kipson – Gokulam Kerala FC (2020)
- Aimable Nsabimana – Minerva Punjab F.C. (2018)
- Jimmy Mulisa – HAL SC (2003–2004)
- Lewis Aniweta – Sporting Clube De Goa (2002–2003) East Bengal FC (2003–2004) Fransa-Pax FC (2004–2005) Mohammedan SC (2005)

== Saint Kitts and Nevis ==
- Gerard Geron Williams – TRAU F.C. (2019–2020; 2021–2022)

== Saint Lucia ==
- Sherwin Emmanuel – Southern Samity A.C. (2012–2013)

== Saint Martin ==
- Cyril Kali – Kerala Blasters FC (2018–2019)

== Saint Vincent and the Grenadine ==
- Caswain Mason – Mahindra United FC (2007)
- Cornelius Stewart – Minerva Punjab F.C. (2019)

== São Tomé and Príncipe ==
- Léonildo Soãres Gonçalves – Chennai City FC (2017)

== Scotland ==
- Alan Gow – East Bengal FC (2011–2012)
- Brad Inman – Mohun Bagan SG (2020–2021) Odisha FC (2021) Mumbai City FC (2021–2022)
- Darryl Duffy – Salgaocar SC (2013–2016) FC Goa (2015), Mohun Bagan (2016–2017)
- Danny Fox – SC East Bengal (2020–2021)
- Martin Scott – Salgaocar SC (2015–2016)
- Mason Robertson – Real Kashmir FC (2018–2022)
- Jamie McAllister – Kerala Blasters FC (2014)
- Peter Maguire – East Bengal F.C. (1990–1991)
- Greg Stewart – Jamshedpur FC (2021–2022) Mumbai City FC (2022–present)
- Scott Ritchie – Ozone FC (2017)
- Stephen Pearson – Kerala Blasters FC (2014), Atletico de Kolkata (2016)

== Senegal ==
- Kassim Aidara – Minerva Punjab FC (2017–2018) East Bengal FC (2018–2020)
- Badara Badji – Delhi Dynamos FC (2016)
- Diawandou Diagne – Odisha FC (2019–2021)
- Diomansy Kamara – NorthEast United FC (2015)
- Elhadji Ousseynou Ndoye – Kerala Blasters FC (2016)
- Ibrahima Niasse – Delhi Dynamos FC (2016)
- Kamara E.O – Sports Academy Tirur (2019–2020)
- Massamba Sambou – NorthEast United FC (2014)
- Momar Ndoye – FC Pune City (2016)
- Mouhamadou Moustapha Gning – Kerala Blasters FC (2019–2020)
- Mourtada Fall – FC Goa (2018–2020) Mumbai City FC (2020–present)
- Modou Sougou – Mumbai City FC (2018–2020)
- Lamine Tamba – Mahindra United FC (2007–2010), Pune F.C. (2010–2011), Air India F.C. (2011–12), Churchill Brothers S.C. (2012–13), Rangdajied United F.C. (2013–2016) Real Kashmir F.C. (2017)
- Talla N'Diaye – Jamshedpur FC (2017)
- Victor Mendy – NorthEast United (2015)
- Demba Diakhaté – Mumbai Tigers F.C. (2012–2014)
- Papa Niang – Minerva Punjab F.C. (2018–2019)
- Papa Babacar Diawara – Mohun Bagan (2020) RoundGlass Punjab FC (2021)
- Dieye Hamidou – ARA FC (2019–2021) Muthoot FA (2022)
- Seila Toure – SAT Tirur (2021–2022)
- Zakaria Diallo – NorthEast United (2022)
- Momo Cisse – Churchill Brothers FC (2022–present)
- Fallou Diagne – Chennaiyin FC (2022–present)
- Ousmane N'Diaye – Mohammedan Sporting (2022–present)
- Abdoulaye Sané – Churchill Brothers FC (2022–present)
- Auguste Somlaga – Gokulam Kerala FC (2022–present)

== Serbia ==
- Aleksandar Ignjatović – RoundGlass Punjab FC (2022–2023)
- Aleksandar Rakić – Chennai City FC (2018)
- Aleksandar Šujdović – HAL SC (2011–2012)
- Andrija Kaluđerović – Delhi Dynamos F.C. (2018–2019)
- Dejan Lekić – Atletico de Kolkata (2015)
- Demir Avdić – Chennai City FC (2020–2021)
- Damir Grgič – FC Pune City (2017–2018)
- Elvedin Škrijelj – Chennai City FC (2020–2021)
- Jan Muzangu – Chennai City FC (2019–2020)
- Lazar Ćirković – Chennaiyin FC (2024–present)
- Marjan Jugović – Bengaluru FC (2017)
- Marko Klisura – Mumbai City FC (2018–2019)
- Matija Babovic - Gokulam Kerala FC (2024) Dempo SC (2024-2025) Inter Kashi (2025–2026), SC Delhi (2026–Present)
- Nemanja Lakić-Pešić – Kerala Blasters FC (2017–2019)
- Nikola Krčmarević – Kerala Blasters FC (2018–2019)
- Nikola Stojanović – Mohammedan Sporting (2021–2023) Gokulam Kerala FC (2024) Inter Kashi FC (2024–2025) Jamshedpur FC (2025–Present)
- Slaviša Stojanović – Kerala Blasters FC (2018–2019)
- Stefan Ilić – Mohammedan Sporting (2021–2022)
- Svetozar Mijin – Mahindra United FC (2009–2010)

== Sierra Leone ==
- Mohamed Kallon – Chirag United Kerala F.C. (2011–2012)
- Dixon Alusine – Peerless SC (2021–2022)
- David Simbo – Gokulam Kerala FC (2022) NEROCA FC (2022–2024)

== Singapore ==
- Iqbal Hamid Hussain – Chennai City FC (2020–2021)
- John Wilkinson – Salgaocar FC (2013)
- Precious Emuejeraye – Churchill Brothers FC (2017)

== Slovakia ==
- Jozef Kapláň – Chennai City F.C. (2018–2019)
- Jakub Sylvestr – Chennaiyin FC (2020–2021)
- Jakub Vojtuš – Mumbai City FC (2024)

== Slovenia ==
- Matej Poplatnik – Kerala Blasters (2018–2019)
- Amir Dervišević – SC East Bengal (2021–2022)
- Rene Mihelič – Chennaiyin FC (2017–2018) Delhi Dynamos F.C. (2018–2019)
- Luka Majcen – Churchill Brothers S.C. (2020–2021) FC Bengaluru United (2021–2022) Gokulam Kerala FC (2022) RoundGlass Punjab FC (2022–2025), Diamond Harbour FC (2025–Present)
- Uroš Poljanec – Chennai City FC (2017–2018)

== Somalia ==
- Mboyo Iyomi Tusevo – Churchill Brothers S.C. (2007–2008) Dempo S.C. (2008–2009)

== South Africa ==
- Cole Alexander – Odisha FC (2020–2021)
- Sameehg Doutie – Atlético de Kolkata (2015–2016) Jamshedpur FC (2017–2018)
- Abdullah Hamza Amaba – HAL SC (2012–2013) Salgaocar S.C. (2013–2014)
- **MacDonald Mukansi** – East Bengal FC (2007–2008)
- Sibongakonke Mbatha – ATK (2017–2018)
- Mbaka Bokembe Dady – Mahindra United FC (2006–2007)
- Sydney Nkalanga – East Bengal F.C. (2005–2006) Fransa-Pax FC (2005–2006)
- Lwandile Mzizi – RFC Kochi (2018–2020)
- William Twala – Madan Maharaj FC (2021)

== South Korea ==
- Do Dong-Hyun – Northeast United FC (2014) East Bengal FC (2015–2016)
- Kim Dong-hyeon – Chennai City F.C. (2018)
- Oh Joo-ho – Shillong Lajong FC (2017–2018)
- Oh Ddog-yi – Churchill Brothers S.C. (2010)
- Kim Soo Hyun – Indian Telephone Industries Limited (1999–2000)
- Park Jae-hyun – Sporting Clube de Goa (2012)
- Sang-Min Kim – Minerva Punjab (2017)
- Yoon Tae – United Sikkim FC (2012–2013)
- Park Kwang-il – FC Pune City (2014)
- Shin Ho-jun – Rangdajied United FC (2013–2014)
- Son Yong-chan – Ozone FC (2017–2018)
- Shin Dong Hun – Indian Telephone Industries Limited (1998–1999)
- Park Jong-oh – Real Kashmir FC (2021–2022)

== South Sudan ==
- James Moga – Sporting Clube de Goa (2011) Pune FC (2012–2013) East Bengal F.C. (2013–2014) Mohammedan S.C. (2016) Rangdajied United F.C. (2016–2017)
- Duach Jock – Chennai City FC (2018)

== Spain ==
- Adrià Carmona – Delhi Dynamos FC (2018–2019)
- Adrián Colunga – FC Goa (2017–2018)
- Adolfo Miranda – Chennai City FC (2019–2020)
- Agustín García Íñiguez – ATK (2019–2020)
- Airam López Cabrera – FC Goa (2021–2022)
- Aitor Fernández – Mumbai City FC (2015)
- Aitor Monroy – Jamshedpur FC (2019–2021)
- Alberto Noguera – FC Goa (2020–2022)
- Álex Barrera – Bengaluru FC (2019)
- Alfred Planas – Inter Kashi (2025-present)
- Alvaro Rubio – Bengaluru FC (2016)
- Álvaro Vázquez – Kerala Blasters FC (2021–2022) FC Goa (2022–2023)
- Andrea Orlandi – Chennaiyin F.C. (2018–2019)
- Albert Serrán – Bengaluru FC (2018–2020)
- Ángel Berlanga – Sporting Clube de Goa (2013)
- Antonio Dovale (Toni) – Bengaluru FC (2017–2018) East Bengal F.C. (2019)
- Aridai Cabrera – Odisha FC (2021–2022)
- Aridane Santana – Odisha FC (2019–2020) Hyderabad FC (2020–2021)
- Arnal Llibert – Atletico de Kolkata (2014)
- Arturo Navarro – Sporting Clube de Goa (2013–2014)
- Basilio Sancho – Atletico de Kolkata (2014)
- Borja Fernández – Atletico de Kolkata (2014–2016)
- Borja Gómez Pérez – East Bengal F.C. (2018–2020)
- Braulio Nóbrega – Bengaluru FC (2017–2018)
- Bruno Herrero Arias – Delhi Dynamos FC (2014) NorthEast United FC (2015) FC Pune City (2016)
- Carlos Calvo Sobrado – Jamshedpur FC (2018–2019)
- Carlos Delgado – Odisha FC (2019–2020; 2022–Present)
- **Carlos Marcos Marchena** – Kerala Blasters FC (2015)
- Carlos Peña – FC Goa (2018–2020)
- Chechi – FC Goa (2017–2018)
- Cristian Bustos – Mumbai City FC (2015)
- Cristian Hidalgo – Chennaiyin FC (2014)
- Dani Mallo – Atletico de Kolkata (2016)
- Daniel Lucas Segovia – Bengaluru FC (2018)
- David Grande Serrano – Jamshedpur FC (2020–2021)
- David Humanes – Inter Kashi FC (2024–2025; 2026–Present)
- Dimas Delgado – Bengaluru FC (2017–2021)
- Edu Bedia – FC Goa (2017–2023), Gokulam Kerala FC (2023–2024)
- Edu García – Bengaluru FC (2017–2018) ATK (2019–2020) Mohun Bagan SG (2020–2021) Hyderabad FC (2021–2022)
- Edu Moya – Delhi Dynamos FC (2017–2018)
- Eduardo Silva Lerma – Chennaiyin FC (2014–2015)
- Ferran Corominas – FC Goa (2017–2020)
- Fran Gómez – Inter Kashi FC (2023–2024)
- Fran González Muñoz – Mohun Bagan (2019–2020) Bengaluru FC (2020–2021) Real Kashmir (2021–2022)
- Francisco Dorronsoro – Delhi Dynamos FC (2018–2019) Odisha FC (2019–2020)
- Francisco José Sota – SC East Bengal (2022)
- Francisco Morante Martínez – Mohun Bagan (2019–2020)\
- Francisco Sandaza – Hyderabad FC (2020–2021)
- Gonzalo Hinojal – Sporting Clube de Goa (2013–2014)
- Héctor Rodas – Odisha FC (2021–2022)
- Hernán Santana – Mumbai City FC (2020–2021) NorthEast United FC (2021–2022)
- Igor Angulo – FC Goa (2020–2021) Mumbai City FC (2021–2022)
- Iñigo Calderón – Chennaiyin FC (2017–2019)
- Iván González – FC Goa (2020–2022) East Bengal (2022–2023)
- Jaime Gavilán – Atletico de Kolkata (2015) Chennaiyin FC (2017–2018)
- Jaime Santos Colado – East Bengal F.C. (2018–2020)
- Javi Fernández – Mumbai City FC (2014)
- Javi Hernández – ATK (2019–2020) Mohun Bagan SG (2020–2021) Odisha FC (2021–2022) Bengaluru FC (2022–2024), Jamshedpur FC (2024–2025)
- Javi Lara – Atletico de Kolkata (2015–2016)
- Javier Siverio – Hyderabad FC (2021–2023), East Bengal FC (2023–2024), Jamshedpur FC (2024–2025), FC Goa (2025)
- Jesús Tato – FC Pune City (2016)
- **Joan Capdevila** – NorthEast United FC (2014)
- Joaquin Garcia – Churchill Brothers S.C. (2019)
- Jofre Mateu – Atletico de Kolkata (2014) FC Goa (2015–2016)
- Jonathan Vila – FC Pune City (2018–2019)
- Jordan Lamela – Inter Kashi FC (2023–2024), SC Bengaluru (2024–2026), Rajasthan United FC (2026–Present)
- Jordi Montel – Atletico de Kolkata (2017–2018)
- Jorge Alonso – Atletico de Kolkata (2015)
- Jorge Ortiz Mendoza – FC Goa (2020–2022)
- Joseba Beitia – Mohun Bagan (2019–2020) RoundGlass Punjab FC (2020–2022), Rajasthan United FC (2022–2023), NorthEast United FC (2023), Delhi FC (2023–2024), Malappuram FC (2024)
- Josemi – Atletico de Kolkata (2014–2015)
- Josué Currais Prieto – Kerala Blasters FC (2015–2016)
- Juan Aguilera – Mumbai City FC (2015)
- Juan Antonio González – Bengaluru FC (2016–2021) Hyderabad FC (2021–present)
- Juan Belencoso – Atletico de Kolkata (2016)
- Juan Calatayud – Atletico de Kolkata (2015)
- Juan Mera Gonzaléz – East Bengal F.C. (2019–2020)
- Juan Quero – DSK Shivajians F.C. (2016–17) Minerva Punjab F.C. (2019)
- Juande Prados López – Kerala Blasters FC (2020–2021)
- Juanfri – Sporting Clube de Goa (2013)
- Julen Colinas – Mohun Bagan (2019–2020)
- Julen Pérez – Inter Kashi FC (2023–2025)
- Lluís Sastre – Hyderabad FC (2020–2021)
- Lluis Tarres – Inter Kashi FC (2026–Present)
- **Luis García** – Atletico de Kolkata (2014)
- Luisma – Bengaluru F.C. (2019)
- Mandi – ATK (2020)
- Manuel Arana Rodríguez – FC Goa (2017–2018) Delhi Dynamos FC (2018)
- Manuel Jesús Ortiz (Lolo) – FC Pune City (2018)
- Manuel Lanzarote – FC Goa (2017–2018) ATK (2018–2019) Chennaiyin F.C. (2021)
- Manuel Onwu – Bengaluru F.C. (2019–2020) Odisha FC (2020–2021)
- Marcos dé la Espada – East Bengal F.C. (2019–2020)
- Marcos Tébar – Delhi Dynamos FC (2016) FC Pune City (2017–2018) Delhi Dynamos FC (2018–2019) Odisha FC (2019–2020)
- Mario Arqués – Jamshedpur FC (2018–2019) Kerala Blasters FC (2019–2020)
- Mario Barco – Inter Kashi FC (2023-2026)
- Martí Crespí – Delhi Dynamos FC (2018–2019) East Bengal FC (2019–2020)
- Miguel Palanca – FC Goa (2018–2019)
- Nauzet Santana – Chennai City FC (2018–2020)
- Néstor Gordillo – Chennai City FC (2018–2019) Hyderabad FC (2019–2020)
- Nili Pérdemo – Bengaluru FC (2020)
- Noé Acosta – Jamshedpur FC (2019–2020)
- Odei Onaindia – Hyderabad FC (2020–2021; 2022–2023), FC Goa (2023–2025)
- Omar Ramos Suárez – Rajasthan United FC (2022), Gokulam Kerala FC (2023)
- Pablo Gallardo – Sporting Clube de Goa (2014) Atletico de Kolkata (2016)
- Pablo Morgado – Jamshedpur FC (2018–2019)
- Pablo Rodríguez – United Sikkim F.C. (2012–2013)
- Pedro Manzi Cruz – Chennai City FC (2018–2020) Mohammedan SC (2021) FC Bengaluru United (2021–2022) Rajasthan United FC (2022), Malappuram FC (2024)
- Piti – Jamshedpur FC (2019–2020)
- Pitu – FC Pune City (2016)
- Rafa – FC Pune City (2017–2018) Hyderabad FC (2019–2020)
- Rafa Jordà – Mumbai City FC (2017–2018)
- Roberto Eslava – Chennai City F.C. (2018–2020)
- Rubén González – Delhi Dynamos FC (2016)
- Salva Chamorro – Mohun Bagan (2019–2020)
- Sandro Rodríguez – Chennai City FC (2018–2020)
- Sergio Castel – Jamshedpur FC (2019–2020)
- Sergio Cidoncha – Jamshedpur FC (2018–2019) Kerala Blasters FC (2019–2020)
- Sergio Llamas – Gokulam Kerala FC (2024–2025), Inter Kashi FC (2026–Present)
- Sergio Mendigutxia – NEROCA FC (2021–2022), Gokulam Kerala FC (2023)
- Tiri – Atletico de Kolkata (2015–2016) Jamshedpur FC (2017–2020) Mohun Bagan SG (2020–2022)
- Toni Doblas – Delhi Dynamos FC (2015–2016)
- Vicente Gómez Umpiérrez – Kerala Blasters FC (2020–2021)
- Victor Pulga – Kerala Blasters FC (2014) (2018)
- Víctor Mongil – ATK (2020) Odisha FC (2021–2022) Kerala Blasters FC (2022–present)
- Xabi Irureta – Delhi Dynamos FC (2018)
- Xisco Hernández – Bengaluru FC (2018–2019) Odisha FC (2019–2020) Bengaluru FC (2021)
- Iker Guarrotxena Vallejo – FC Goa (2022–present)
- Marc Valiente – FC Goa (2022–present)
- Saúl Crespo Prieto – Odisha FC (2022–present)
- Pedro Martín Moreno – Odisha FC (2022–present)
- Víctor Rodríguez – Odisha FC (2022–present)
- Borja Herrera – Hyderabad FC (2022–present)
- Pedro Tanausú Domínguez – Churchill Brothers (2022–present)
- Jon Gaztañaga – NorthEast United FC (2022–present)
- Manuel Cordero Giuli – Churchill Brothers (2022–present)
- Pablo Pérez – Bengaluru FC (2022–present)

== Sri Lanka ==
- Anton Silva – Indian Bank Recreational Club (1998–1999)
- Mohammed Nizam Pakir Ali – Vasco SC Goa (1986–1987)
- Selim Noor – East Bengal F.C. (1961–1962)
- Charitha Mudiyanselage – FC Kerala (2020)
- Abdul Azeez Rehman – Indian Bank Recreational Club (2003–2004)
- Kamaldeen Fuard – Indian Bank Recreational Club (2003–2004)
- Kasun Nadika Jayasuriya – Indian Bank Recreational Club (2002–2003) Dempo S.C. (2003–2004)
- Imran Mohammed – Indian Bank Recreational Club (2002–2003)
- Mohideen Mohamed Rawme – Indian Bank Recreational Club (2003–2004)
- Roshan Perera – Mohun Bagan (1998–1999)
- TN Bagoos – Indian Bank Recreational Club (1999–2001) Dempo S.C. (2002)
- Peter Wilfred – East Bengal FC (1955–1956)
- Channa Ediri Bandanage – Dempo S.C. (2002–2003)
- A.S. Mahendran – Indian Bank Recreational Club (2002–2003)
- Mohamed Izzadeen – Dempo S.C. (2010–2011)
- Hammed Mohammed Nazir – Indian Bank Recreational Club (1998–1999)
- Ahmed Waseem Razeek – Gokulam Kerala FC (2022–present)

== Suriname ==
- Roland Alberg – Hyderabad FC (2020–2021)

== Sweden ==
- Bojan Djordjic – Chennaiyin FC (2014–2015)
- **Freddie Ljungberg** – Mumbai City FC (2014)
- Maic Sema – NorthEast United FC (2018)
- Pierre Tillman – Chennaiyin FC (2014)
- Simon Lundevall – NorthEast United FC (2020)
- George Ekeh – Mohun Bagan (2002–2003) Churchill Brothers S.C. (2005–2007)
- Simon Azoulay Pedersen – Chirag United Kerala F.C. (2011–2012)
- Nicolas Nath – Sporting Clube De Goa (2006–2007)
- Ulf Johansson – East Bengal F.C. (1996–1997)

== Switzerland ==
- Marco Pittà – Churchill Brothers S.C. (2003–2004)
- Jan Bergér – East Bengal F.C. (2009) Dempo SC (2009)
- P.K. Anil Kumar – Salgaocar S.C. (2007–2008)

== Syria ==
- Ahmad Al Kaddour – Churchill Brothers S.C. (2013)
- Hasan Al Moustafa – Prayag United S.C. (2013–2014)
- Khaled Al Saleh – Gokulam Kerala F.C. (2017)
- Mahmoud Al Amnah – Sporting Clube De Goa (2015–2016) Aizawl F.C. (2017) East Bengal F.C. (2017–2018) Minerva Punjab F.C. (2019) Southern Samity (2019–2020)
- Naser Al Sebai – Churchill Brothers S.C. (2013)
- Yasser Shahen – Churchill Brothers S.C. (2013)
- Taha Dyab – Real Kashmir F.C. (2018)
- Shaher Shaheen – Mohammedan S.C. (2021–present)
- Wael Ayan – Mohammedan S.C. (2017–2018)
- Fares Arnaout – FC Goa (2022–2023)
- Thaer Krouma – Mumbai City FC (2024–present)

== Tanzania ==
- Ally Mayay Tembele – East Bengal F.C. (2001–2002)
- Yonah Elias Ndabila – Peerless SC (2015)

== Tajikistan ==
- Komron Tursunov – Mohun Bagan (2020) TRAU FC (2020–2021) Rajasthan United FC (2021–2022) Churchill Brothers (2022) TRAU FC (2022–present)
- Rustam Zabirov – Vasco S.C. (2000–2001)
- Suhrob Solehov – Southern Samity (2015–2016) Vajra United FC (2016–2017)
- Fatkhullo Fatkhuloev – Chennaiyin FC (2020–2021)
- Bakhtior Kalandarov – Aizawl FC (2022–present)
- Nuriddin Davronov – Mohammedan Sporting (2022–present)
- Daler Yodgorov – Gokulam Kerala FC (2022–present)
- Nozim Babadjanov – Real Kashmir FC (2022–present)
- Shavkati Khotam – Sudeva Delhi FC (2023–present)
- Alisher Kholmurodov – NorthEast United FC (2023–present)

== Thailand ==
- Dusit Chalermsan – Mohun Bagan (1999–2001)
- Jatvpong Thongsukh – Mohun Bagan (2000–2001)
- Wisoot Bunpeng – Viva Kerala F.C. (2009)

== Tibet ==
- Tashi Tsering – Gangtok Himalayan S.C. (2009–2010)
- Tenzin Dhondup – Shillong United (2017–2019)
- Tenzin Samdup – Chennai City FC (2018–2019) Real Kashmir FC (2019–2020) Kenkre FC (2021–present)
- Tashi Samphel – Gangtok Himalayan S.C. (2017–2018)
- Tsering Dhundup – R.S.C. Calicut (2006–2007)
- Dawa Tsering – Dhanglob Rukhag (2003–2007) Potala FC (2007)
- Pema Lhundup – Gangtok Himalayan S.C. (2018–2019)
- Tamding Tsering – Uttar Pradesh Police (1997–1999)
- Tsering Dorjee – Dharmashala Club (2004–2006)
- Tenzin Tsephel – Garhwal Heroes FC (2009) Sikkim Aakraman FC (2015–2017)
- Tenzin Bhakdo – DYSA Mundgod (2021–present)
- Tenzin Norbu Tekhang – Dhondupling FC (2020–present)

== Timor-Leste ==
- Murilo de Almeida – Chennai City FC (2017–2018)
- Thiago Oliveira Fernandes – Gokulam Kerala FC (2018–2019)
- Thiago Santos Cunha – Mumbai City FC (2016)

== Togo ==
- Dosseh Attivi – United Sikkim F.C. (2012–2013)
- Gaty Kouami – NEROCA F.C. (2019–2020)
- Gley Yao Rodrigue – Mohun Bagan (2005)
- Raphaël Patron Akakpo – Mahindra United F.C. (2003–2005)
- Sekle Yao Zico – NEROCA F.C. (2019–2020)
- Sogan Kokou – United Sikkim F.C. (2012–2013)

== Trinidad and Tobago ==
- Andre Ettienne – Gokulam Kerala F.C. (2019–2020)
- **Anthony Wolfe** – Churchill Brothers S.C. (2013–2014) Sporting Clube de Goa (2014–2015) Churchill Brothers S.C. (2017) (2018–2019) Peerless SC (2019–2020)
- Carlyle Mitchell – East Bengal F.C. (2017)
- Daneil Cyrus – Mohun Bagan (2019–2020)
- **Densill Theobald** – Dempo S.C. (2012–2013) Royal Wahingdoh (2015) Sporting Clube de Goa (2016) Mumbai F.C. (2017)
- **Cornell Glen** – Shillong Lajong F.C. (2013–2015) NorthEast United FC (2014) Mohun Bagan (2015–2016) Ozone FC (2016–2017) Bengaluru FC (2017)
- **Cyd Gray** – Pune F.C. (2008)
- Daniel Carr – FC Bengaluru United (2021–present)
- Judah García – NEROCA F.C. (2020–2021)
- Marcus Joseph – Gokulam Kerala F.C. (2019–2020)
- Marvin Phillip – NEROCA F.C. (2019–2020)
- Nathaniel García – Gokulam Kerala F.C. (2019–2020) NEROCA F.C. (2020–present)
- Neil Michael Benjamin – Kerala United FC (2019–2020)
- Radanfah Abu Bakr – Churchill Brothers S.C. (2019–2020)
- Glenton Wolfe – Churchill Brothers S.C. (2014) Sporting Club de Goa (2014–2015)
- Richard Roy – NEROCA F.C. (2017–2018)
- Robert Primus – Minerva Punjab FC (2019) Churchill Brothers S.C. (2019–2020) FC Bengaluru United (2020–2021) Aizawl FC (2022–present)
- Russell Ralph Alfred – Gokulam Kerala F.C. (2018–2019)
- Taryk Sampson – NEROCA F.C. (2019–2020)
- **Tony Warner** – NorthEast United FC (2015–2016)
- Willis Déon Plaza – East Bengal F.C. (2017–2018) Mohammedan S.C. (2018) Churchill Brothers S.C. (2018–2019) Mohammedan S.C. (2020)
- Omari Abiel Bairad – Gokulam Kerala Reserves (2022–present)

== Tunisia ==
- Amine Chermiti – Mumbai City FC (2019–2020)
- **Hamdi Marzouki** – Salgaocar S.C. (2011–2012)
- Mohamed Larbi – Mumbai City FC (2019–2020)
- **Selim Benachour** – Mumbai City FC (2015)

== Turkey ==
- Tuncay Şanlı – FC Pune City (2015)

== Turkmenistan ==
- Nurjan Komekov – Almora Burans (2016–2017) Vajra United F.C. (2018–2020)

== Uganda ==
- Brian Umony – Gokulam Kerala F.C. (2017–2018)
- Henry Kisekka – Gokulam Kerala FC (2018) Mohun Bagan (2018–2019) Gokulam Kerala FC (2019–2020) Bhawanipore FC (2021–2022) Mohammedan SC (2022) Aizawl FC (2022–present)
- Isaac Isinde – TRAU F.C. (2019–2020)
- Ivan Bukenya – East Bengal FC (2016)
- Khalid Aucho – East Bengal F.C. (2018) Churchill Brothers SC (2018–2019)
- Boban Zirintusa – Mohun Bagan (2018)
- Kizito Keziron – Kerala Blasters FC (2017–2019)
- Michael Ajayi – Mohammedan S.C. (2004) Tollygunge Agragami (2005)
- Richard Kasagga – Aizawl FC (2019–2021)
- Bakali Kasule – Air India F.C. (2019–2020)
- Musa Mudde – Gokulam Kerala FC (2017–2018) Sports Academy Tirur (2018–2019) Mohammedan S.C. (2019–2020)
- Habib Kavuma – Southern Samity (2022–present)

== Ukraine ==
- Andriy Malchevsky – Churchill Brothers S.C. (1999–2000) East Bengal F.C. (2000–2001)
- Mykola Shevchenko – Churchill Brothers S.C. (1999–2000) Dempo S.C. (2001)
- Alexy Drobotov – Dempo S.C. (1998–1999) Churchill Brothers S.C. (1999–2000)
- Roland Rasel Bilala – Minerva Punjab F.C. (2019)
- Ronaque Bakshi – Chhinga Veng F.C. (2018–2020) Hindustan FC (2018–2019)
- Ivan Kalyuzhnyi – Kerala Blasters FC (2022–present)

== United Arab Emirates ==
- Badar Khail – Gokulam Kerala FC (2017)

== United States of America ==
- Avneet Shergill – Salgaocar FC (2009–2010)
- Jonny Campbell – FC Bengaluru United (2020)
- Samuel Bradley – Kenkre FC Mumbai (2016–2017)
- Joseph Lapira – United Sikkim FC (2011)
- Spencer Johnson – Kenkre FC Mumbai (2016)

== Uruguay ==
- Adrián Luna Retamar – Kerala Blasters FC (2021–present)
- **Diego Forlán** – Mumbai City FC (2016)
- Emiliano Alfaro – NorthEast United FC (2016) FC Pune City (2017–2018) ATK (2018)
- Federico Gallego – NorthEast United FC (2018–2022) Mohun Bagan SG (2023–present)
- Juan Cruz Mascia – NorthEast United FC (2018–2019)
- Martín Cháves – NorthEast United FC (2019–2020) Rajasthan United FC (2022–present)
- Martín Díaz – NorthEast United FC (2017–2018), FC Pune City (2018–2019)
- Matías Mirabaje – Delhi Dynamos FC (2017–2018) Mumbai City F.C. (2018–2019)
- Sasha Aneff Rosso – NorthEast United FC (2016)
- Walter Ibáñez – Mumbai City FC (2016)

== Uzbekistan ==
- Azamat Abduraimov – Mohammedan Sporting Club (1991–1992) Salgaocar S.C. (1999–2000)
- Olim Talliev – East Bengal F.C. (2000–2001)
- Vladislav Nuriev – Fateh Hyderabad A.F.C. (2017–2018) ARA FC (2021–present)
- Evgeniy Kochnev – Gokulam Kerala FC (2018)
- Golum Urunov – Gokulam Kerala FC (2017)
- Ilhom Sharipov – East Bengal F.C. (2000–2001)
- Sergey Tokov – Pune FC (2009–2010) Chirag United Kerala FC (2010–2011)
- Igor Shkvyrin – Mohun Bagan (1999–2000) Churchill Brothers S.C. (2000–2001)
- Kashimov Awazbek – Vasco S.C. (2000–2001)
- Sherzod Nazarov – Vasco S.C. (2008–2009)
- Ravshan Teshabaev – Vasco S.C. (2008–2009)
- Ibrahim Kabba – Sports Academy Tirur (2016–2017)
- Tuychiev Nodirjon – Ahbab FC (2017–2018)
- Sergey Nikolay Andreyev – Dempo S.C. (2002–2003)
- Anvar Jabborov – Vasco S.C. (1999–2000)
- Arslan Talipov – Dempo S.C. (2001–2002)
- Maksim Nikolaev – Dempo S.C. (2000–2001)
- Yorqin Nazarov – Vasco S.C. (2008–2009)
- Akobir Turaev – TRAU FC (2021–2022)
- Olimjon Karimov – Aizawl FC (2021–2022)
- Sardor Jakhonov – Rajasthan United FC (2022) NEROCA FC (2022–present)
- Mirjalol Kasimov – NEROCA FC (2022–2023) Mohammedan SC (2023–present)
- Otabek Zokirov – Rajasthan United FC (2023–present)
- Samandar Ochilov – Mumbai Kenkre FC (2023–present)

== Venezuela ==
- Gabriel Cichero – Delhi Dynamos FC (2017–2018)
- Miku Fédor – Bengaluru FC (2017–2019)

== Vietnam ==
- Dinh Văn Tâ – Churchill Brothers SC (2017)
- Lê Văn Tân – Gokulam Kerala FC (2018)

== Wales ==
- Aaron Amadi-Holloway – SC East Bengal (2020–2021)
- David Rhys Cotterill – ATK (2018)

== Yemen ==
- Khaled Hasan Baleid – Salgaocar F.C. (2015)
- Aiman Al-Hagri – Shillong Lajong F.C. (2017–2018)

== Zambia ==
- Aaron Katebe – Real Kashmir F.C. (2018–2020)
- Kondwani Mtonga – Shillong Lajong F.C. (2013–2014) NorthEast United FC (2014–2015)
- Isaac Chansa – NorthEast United FC (2014) Shillong Lajong FC (2014–2015)
- Francis Kasonde – Salgaocar F.C. (2014–2015)
- Sipho Mumbi – Dolo Mando FC (2010)

== Zimbabwe ==
- Costa Nhamoinesu – Kerala Blasters FC (2020–2021)
- Oscar Hunda – Churchill Brothers (2000)
- Noel Tafadzwa Kaseke – Mohun Bagan (2003–2004)
- Tapera Madzima – Churchill Brothers S.C. (1998–1999) FC Kochin (1999–2000)
- Simbarashe Gate – Mohammedan Sporting Club (2013), (2015–2016)
- Victor Kamhuka – Pathachakra FC (2017–2018) Bhawanipore FC (2019)
- David Makandawire – Mohammedan Sporting Club (2005–2007) (2009–2011)
- Matthew Tendai – United Sports (2021–2022)
- Davis Jelvas Kamanga – United Sports (2021–2022) NEROCA FC (2022–present)
- Ian Nekati – United Sports (2022)

== Players in World Cup ==
- Players who have represented their nations at the FIFA World Cup.

Name	Country	Club(s)
Achille Emaná	Cameroon	Mumbai City FC
Adrian Mutu	Romania	FC Pune City
Ahmad Sanjari	Iran	Mohammedan SC
Alessandro Del Piero	Italy	Delhi Dynamos
Alessandro Nesta	Italy	Chennaiyin FC
Alexandros Tzorvas	Greece	NorthEast United
André Santos	Brazil	FC Goa
Anthony Wolfe	(Trinidad and Tobago) Trinidad Tobago	Churchill Brothers, SC dé Goa, Peerless SC
Asamoah Gyan	Ghana	NorthEast United
Bartholomew Ogbeche	Nigeria	NorthEast United, Kerala Blasters, Mumbai City, Hyderabad FC
Boubacar Sanogo	Ivory Coast	NorthEast United
Carlos Hernández	Costa Rica	Dempo SC
Carlos Marchena	Spain	Kerala Blasters
Cornell Glen	(Trinidad and Tobago) Trinidad & Tobago	Shillong Lajong, NorthEast United, Mohun Bagan, Bengaluru FC, Ozone
Cyd Gray	(Trinidad and Tobago) Trinidad & Tobago	Pune FC
David James	England	Kerala Blasters
David Trezeguet	France	FC Pune City
Densill Theobald	(Trinidad and Tobago) Trinidad & Tobago	Dempo, Royal Wahingdoh, SC dé Goa, Mumbai FC
Didier Zokora	Ivory Coast	FC Pune City, NorthEast United
Diego Forlán	Uruguay	Mumbai City
Dimitri Petratos	Australia	Mohun Bagan SG
Elano Blumer	Brazil	Chennaiyin FC
Emeka Ezeugo	Nigeria	East Bengal, Mohun Bagan, Mohammedan SC, Churchill Brothers
Eric Djemba-Djemba	Cameroon	Chennaiyin FC
Florent Malouda	France	Delhi Dynamos
Freddie Ljungberg	Sweden	Mumbai City
Hamdi Marzouki	Tunisia	Salgaocar
Hélder Postiga	Portugal	Atlético de Kolkata
Jamie Maclaren	Australia	Mohun Bagan SG
Jason Cummings	Australia	Mohun Bagan SG
Joan Capdevila	Spain	NorthEast United
Jhonny Acosta	Costa Rica	East Bengal
Kalu Uche	Nigeria	FC Pune City, Delhi Dynamos, ATK
Kostas Katsouranis	Greece	FC Pune City
Kris Bright	New Zealand	Bharat FC
Kwesi Appiah	Ghana	NorthEast United
Leo Bertos	New Zealand	NorthEast United, East Bengal
Lúcio	Brazil	FC Goa
Luis García	Spain	Atlético de Kolkata
MacDonald Mukansi	South Africa	East Bengal
Marco Materazzi	Italy	Chennaiyin FC
Majid Bishkar	Iran	East Bengal, Mohammedan SC
Mikaël Silvestre	France	Chennaiyin FC
Michael Rodríguez	Costa Rica	United Sikkim
Miroslav Slepička	Czech Republic	FC Goa
Nicolas Anelka	France	Mumbai City
Robbie Keane	Republic of Ireland	Atlético de Kolkata
Robert Pires	France	FC Goa
Roberto Carlos	Brazil	Delhi Dynamos
Romaric Ndri	Ivory Coast	NorthEast United
Selim Benachour	Tunisia	Mumbai City FC
Simão Sabrosa	Portugal	NorthEast United
Simon Colosimo	Australia	Dempo SC
Tim Cahill	Australia	Jamshedpur FC
Tomi Juric	Australia	NorthEast United FC
Tony Warner	(Trinidad and Tobago) Trinidad & Tobago	NorthEast United FC
Wes Brown	England	Kerala Blasters FC

== See also ==
- **Main Pages**
  - List of football clubs in India
  - List of foreign Indian Super League players
  - List of Indian Super League marquees
  - List of Indian players in foreign leagues
  - Indian football league system
- **Category**
  - Expatriate footballers in India
  - List of I-League players
  - List of I-League 2nd Division players
  - Indian expatriate footballers
- **Others**
  - Football in India
  - State football leagues in India
  - Indian football clubs in Asian competitions

== Footnotes ==
1. Player of Indian Origin (Non-resident Indian and person of Indian origin)
2. On 5 April 2020, it was announced that then I-League side East Bengal FC roped in Omid Singh on a two-year deal, however he has never appeared with the club in any league match. On 14 July 2021, FIFA asked SC East Bengal to pay the salary of Singh after the club refused to pay it.
3. Fred Pugsley is considered as the first ever foreigner, signed by an Indian football club.
4. Born in Australia
5. Born in Argentina
6. Born in Bosnia and Herzegovina
7. Born in Bosnia and Herzegovina (then part of SFR Yugoslavia)
8. Born in Brazil
9. Born in Canada
10. Born in Czech Republic (then part of the Czechoslovakia)
11. Born in Cameroon
12. Born in Croatia (then part of SFR Yugoslavia)
13. Born in Denmark
14. Born in England
15. Born in France
16. Born in French Guiana (Overseas department of the French Republic)
17. Born in Guinea
18. Born in Germany
19. Born in Ghana
20. Born in India
21. Born in Iran
22. Born in Japan
23. Born in Kosovo (then part of SFR Yugoslavia)
24. Born in Kuwait
25. Born in Liberia
26. Born in Nepal
27. Born in the Netherlands
28. Born in New Caledonia (Overseas department of the French Republic)
29. Born in Nigeria
30. Born in Northern Ireland
31. Born in Portugal
32. Born in Republic of Upper Volta
33. Born in Russia (then part of the Soviet Union)
34. Born in Saudi Arabia
35. Born in Scotland
36. Born in São Tomé and Príncipe
37. Born in Serbia (then part of SFR Yugoslavia)
38. Born in Serbia (then SFR Yugoslavia)
39. Born in South Korea
40. Born in Spain
41. Born in Switzerland
42. Born in Sudan
43. Born in Uganda
44. Born in the Ukrainian Soviet Socialist Republic
45. Born in the Uruguay
46. Born in the United States of America
47. Born in West Germany (now part of Germany)
48. Born in Zaire (now known as Democratic Republic of Congo)
49. Capped for the Albania national under-21 football team
50. Capped for the Australia men's national soccer team
51. Capped for the Basque Country national football team
52. Capped for the Brazil national under-20 football team
53. Capped for the Catalonia national football team
54. Capped for the England national football C team
55. Capped for the England national under-19 football team
56. Capped for the England national under-21 football team
57. Capped for the France national football team
58. Capped for the France national football B team
59. Capped for the France national under-20 football team
60. Capped for the France national under-21 football team
61. Capped for the French Guiana national football team
62. Capped for the Galicia national football team
63. Capped for the Ghana national football team
64. Capped for the Malaysia national football team
65. Capped for the Nepal national football team
66. Capped for the Northern Cyprus national football team
67. Capped for the India national rugby union team
68. Capped for the Republic of Ireland national under-21 football team
69. Capped for the Republic of Ireland national football team
70. Capped for the Netherlands national under-20 football team
71. Capped for the Spain national under-21 football team
72. Capped for the Spain national under-20 football team
73. Capped for the Spain national under-19 football team
74. Capped for the Uzbekistan national football team
75. Fred Pugsley is considered as the first ever foreign football player to sign and play for an Indian club (East Bengal Club)
76. Tarapada Ray was born in the Bengal Presidency, British India. He made his senior international debut for Pakistan national team during the Asian Quadrangular Football Tournament in 1953, before acquiring the Citizenship of India. Between 1955 and 1956, he became an Indian citizen and played for Kolkata-based clubs such as East Bengal FC, Aryans and Bengal Nagpur Railway.
77. Balai Dey was born in the Bengal Presidency, British India. He made his senior international debut for Pakistan national team during their China tour in 1964, before acquiring the Citizenship of India. He later broke into the India national team in 1969 and earned the title "Indian Rock" for outstanding performance in the Merdeka Tournament in Malaysia in the same year.
78. Ryan played for Australia U20, Australia U-23 and Australia befroe acquiring up Indian passsport and in 2026, he got the call to play for India in a friendly against Bhutan where he scored a goal in the 6-1 win.
