= Aquil Ahmed =

British Indian footballer

Personal information
- Full name: Pirzada Aquil Ahmed
- Position: Centre-half

Senior career*
Years	Team	Apps	(Gls)
- Kalighat
1934–1936	Mohammedan Sporting		
1937–1940s	Bhawanipore		
1950s	Colony Textile Mills		

International career
1934–1937	India XI		
- * Club domestic league appearances and goals

Pirzada Aquil Ahmed, or simply known as Aquil Ahmed, was a former footballer, who notably played for the Mohammedan Sporting in the 1930s, Aquil also represented the Indian national team.

== Club career ==
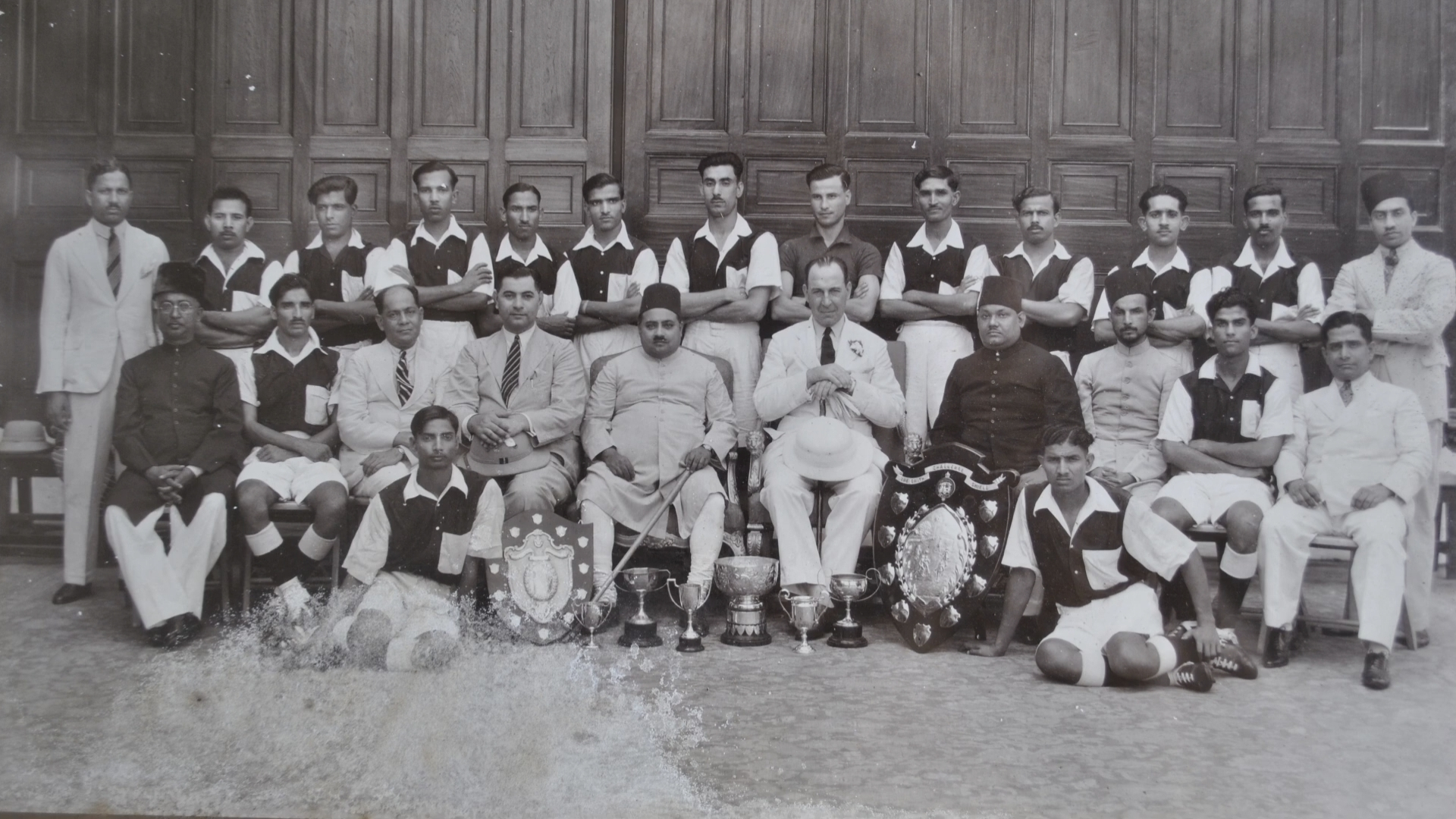
Ahmed (sitting second from right, middle row) with Mohammedan Sporting in 1935.

Early in his career, Ahmed played and later managed the Young Men's Club of Delhi, he also played for the Kalighat football team. He was recruited to join Mohammedan Sporting in their debut to the first division league in 1934, contributing to the team's first division title, and helping them reclaim it for the next two consecutive years.

Aquil would then join Bhawanipore Club in 1937. After partition, he played and captained the Colony Textile Mills team.

== International career ==
In 1934, Aquil toured South Africa with the Indian national team. Aquil was also a part of the Indian's XI on numerous occasions. Regularly featuring against the European XI.

== Post-retirement ==
After the partition of India, Aquil opted to move to Pakistan.

In Pakistan, Aquil would become the coach of Terror Club of Lahore. He also served as a member of the board of the club later on.

== Honours ==
Mohammedan Sporting

- IFA Shield: 1936
- Smith Challenge Shield Tournament: 1935
- Serampore Championship Challenge Cup: 1934
