= Pierre Tillman =

Swedish footballer (born 1987)

Personal information
- Full name: Pierre Johan Tillman
- Date of birth: March 2, 1987 (age 39)
- Place of birth: Sweden
- Position: Midfielder

Team information
- Current team: SK Argo

Senior career*
Years	Team	Apps	(Gls)
2006–2007	Falkenbergs FF	2	(0)
2008–2014	Varbergs BoIS	146	(21)
2014	Chennaiyin FC	0	(0)
2015	FC Djursholm Andrea Doria	8	(0)
2016–2017	Varbergs GIF	28	(5)
2018	Träslövsläge IF	7	(0)
2021–	SK Argo	31	(10)
- * Club domestic league appearances and goals

Pierre Johan Tillman (born 2 March 1987) is a Swedish footballer who plays as a midfielder for SK Argo.

== Early life ==
Tillman started his career with Swedish side Falkenbergs FF. He was described as "barely given playing time by then-coach Stig Kristensson".

== Playing career ==
In 2008, Tillman signed for Swedish side Varbergs BoIS. He helped the club achieve promotion. He was regarded as one of the club's most important players. He suffered a knee injury while playing for them. In 2014, he signed for Indian side Chennaiyin FC. He was unable to play for the club because of a transfer issue. After that, he trialed for Indian side Odisha FC. In 2015, he signed for Swedish side FC Djursholm Andrea Doria. In 2016, he signed for Swedish side Varbergs GIF. In 2018, he signed for Swedish side Träslövsläge IF. In 2021, he signed for Swedish side SK Argo.

== Style of play ==
Tillman mainly operates as a midfielder. He operated as a striker earlier in his career.

== Post-playing career ==
After retiring from professional football, Tillman founded startup Omnia.

== Personal life ==
Tillman has had Carl-Johan Fransén as his agent. He had planned to move to Stockholm, Sweden with his then-girlfriend in 2013 but he moved to Gothenburg, Sweden instead.
