= 2006–07 East Bengal FC season =

Indian football club season

East Bengal
2006–07 season
- President: Dr Pranab Dasgupta
- Head-Coach: (Brazil) Carlos Pereira
- Ground: Salt Lake Stadium; East Bengal Ground
- National Football League: 5th
- Calcutta Football League: Champions
- Federation Cup: Quarter-Finals
- IFA Shield: Group Stage
- Durand Cup: Group Stage
- Top goalscorer: League: Edmilson (13); All: Edmilson (13)
Home colours	Away colours

The 2006–07 season was East Bengal's 11th season in the National Football League and 87th season in existence.

== Competitions ==
=== Overall ===
Competition	First match	Last match	Final position
Calcutta Football League	2 August 2006	7 November 2006	Champions
Durand Cup	20 November 2006	24 November 2006	Group Stage
IFA Shield	7 December 2006	11 December 2006	Group Stage
Federation Cup	20 December 2006	23 December 2006	Quarter-Finals
National Football League	7 January 2007	19 May 2007	5th

=== Overview ===
Competition	Record							
Competition	Pld	W	D	L	GF	GA	GD	Win %
Calcutta Football League	14	10	2	2	20	5	+15	71.43
Durand Cup	3	0	1	2	1	6	−5	0.00
IFA Shield	2	0	1	1	1	2	−1	0.00
Federation Cup	2	1	0	1	2	1	+1	50.00
National Football League	18	7	5	6	29	29	+0	38.89
Total	39	18	9	12	53	43	+10	46.15

Last updated: 1 June 2007
Source: Competitions

=== Calcutta Football League ===
East Bengal finished the 2006 Calcutta Premier Division as the champions with 32 points from 14 matches. Captain Alvito D'Cunha scored the solitary goal in the final game against Eastern Railway to win back the Calcutta League title after losing out the previous year to arch-rivals Mohun Bagan.

==== Fixtures & results ====
Win Draw Loss

2 August 2006 1	East Bengal	2–0	George Telegraph	Kolkata
	Alvito D'Cunha 70'; Ashim Biswas 76'	Report		Stadium: East Bengal Ground; Referee: Udayan Haldar; Man of the Match: Alvito D'Cunha (East Bengal)

6 August 2006 2	East Bengal	3–0	Railway FC	Kolkata
	Chandan Das 67'; Vincent Pires 77'; Yumnam Raju 90+1'	Report		Stadium: East Bengal Ground; Referee: Minangshu Bhattacharya; Man of the Match: Dipankar Roy (East Bengal)

18 August 2006 3	East Bengal	1–0	United	Kolkata
	Vincent Pires 64'	Report		Stadium: East Bengal Ground; Referee: Sunando Bose; Man of the Match: Dipankar Roy (East Bengal)

21 August 2006 4	East Bengal	2–0	Calcutta Port Trust	Kolkata
	Luis Octavio da Silva 68'; Dipankar Roy 55'	Report		Stadium: East Bengal Ground; Referee: Rathin Mukherjee; Man of the Match: Sasthi Duley (East Bengal)

26 August 2006 5	East Bengal	0–1	Mohun Bagan	Kolkata
		Report	Bhaichung Bhutia 40'	Stadium: Salt Lake Stadium; Referee: Subrata Sarkar; Man of the Match: Sangram Mukherjee (Mohun Bagan)

1 September 2006 6	East Bengal	0–0	Eastern Railway	Kolkata
		Report		Stadium: East Bengal Ground; Referee: Dhanapati Roy; Man of the Match: Tapan Kumar Karmakar (Eastern Railway)

14 September 2006 7	East Bengal	4–2	Mohammedan Sporting	Kolkata
	Ashim Biswas 1'; Marcio Fernandes Tomaz 19'; Syed Rahim Nabi 32'; Chandan Das 45+1'	Report	Subhashish Roy Chowdhury 5'; Kalia Kulothungan 13'	Stadium: Salt Lake Stadium; Referee: Subrata Sarkar; Man of the Match: Snehasish Chakraborty (East Bengal)

19 September 2006 8	Railway FC	0–1	East Bengal	Kolkata
		Report	Ashim Biswas 58'	Stadium: East Bengal Ground; Referee: Subrata Das; Man of the Match: Syed Rahim Nabi (East Bengal)

23 September 2006 9	United	0–2	East Bengal	Kolkata
		Report	Syed Rahim Nabi 54'; Wajid Ali 68' (o.g.)	Stadium: East Bengal Ground; Referee: Minangshu Bhattacharya; Man of the Match: not handed out

26 September 2006 10	Mohun Bagan	1–0	East Bengal	Kolkata
	Ndem Guy Herve 49'; Bhaichung Bhutia (red card) 88'	Report	Muttah Suresh (yellow card) 50' (red card) 90+1'	Stadium: Salt Lake Stadium; Referee: Debashish Mishra; Man of the Match: Ndem Guy Herve (Mohun Bagan)

28 October 2006 11	George Telegraph	0–1	East Bengal	Kolkata
		Report	Alvito D'Cunha 2'	Stadium: East Bengal Ground; Referee: Subrata Das; Man of the Match: Alvito D'Cunha (East Bengal)

1 November 2006 12	Calcutta Port Trust	1–3	East Bengal	Kolkata
	Sujit Dey 62'	Report	Alvito D'Cunha 4' (yellow card) (yellow-red card); Saumik Dey 27'; Fredy Mascarenhas 49'	Stadium: East Bengal Ground; Referee: Barun Saha; Man of the Match: Saumik Dey (East Bengal)

4 November 2006 13	Mohammedan Sporting	0–0	East Bengal	Kolkata
		Report		Stadium: Salt Lake Stadium; Referee: Minangshu Bhattacharya; Man of the Match: Habibur Rehman Mondal (Mohammedan Sporting)

7 November 2006 14	Eastern Railway	0–1	East Bengal	Kolkata
	Sanjit Dutta Bhowmick (yellow card) 60' (red card) 73'	Report	Alvito D'Cunha 70' (red card) 73'	Stadium: East Bengal Ground; Referee: Kashinath Sen; Man of the Match: Muttah Suresh (East Bengal)

=== Durand Cup ===
Group B

Team	Pld	W	D	L	GF	GA	GD	Pts
(India) JCT	3	1	2	0	5	1	+4	5
(India) Dempo	3	1	2	0	3	2	+1	5
(India) Army XI	3	1	1	1	3	3	0	4
(India) East Bengal	3	0	1	2	1	6	−5	1

Source: 119th "Osian's" Durand Cup 2006

East Bengal was grouped alongside JCT, Dempo and Army XI in Group B. East Bengal drew 0–0 against Dempo in the opening fixture but 0–4 against JCT and 1–2 against Army XI as they were eliminated from the group stages.

==== Fixtures & results ====
Win Draw Loss

20 November 2006 Group Stage	East Bengal	0–0	Dempo	Delhi
	Dipankar Roy (red card) 46'	Report		Stadium: Ambedkar Stadium

22 November 2006 Group Stage	East Bengal	0–4	JCT	Delhi
		Report	Parveen Kumar 22'; Sunday Ambrose 63'; Adebayo Tokunbo 81'; Muttah Suresh 83' (o.g.)	Stadium: Ambedkar Stadium

24 November 2006 Group Stage	East Bengal	1–2	Army XI	Delhi
	Alvito D'Cunha 53'	Report	Vijay Thapa 47', 67'	Stadium: Ambedkar Stadium; Referee: Mohammed Kamil

=== IFA Shield ===
Group A

Team	Pld	W	D	L	GF	GA	GD	Pts
(India) Sporting Club de Goa	2	1	1	0	1	0	+1	4
(India) Mahindra United	2	0	2	0	1	1	0	2
(India) East Bengal	2	0	1	1	1	2	−1	1

Source: 112th IFA Shield 2006

East Bengal was grouped alongside Mahindra United and Sporting Club de Goa in Group A. East Bengal lost 1–0 against Sporting Club de Goa in the opening game and drew 1–1 against Mahindra United as they were eliminated from the group stages.

==== Fixtures & results ====
Win Draw Loss

7 December 2006 Group Stage	East Bengal	0–1	Sporting Club de Goa	Kolkata
		Report	Dudu Omagbemi 57'	Stadium: Salt Lake Stadium; Referee: Mohammed Kamal

11 December 2006 Group Stage	East Bengal	1–1	Mahindra United	Kolkata
	Alvito D'Cunha 57'	Report	Yusif Yakubu 25'	Stadium: Salt Lake Stadium; Referee: Benjamin D'Silva

=== Federation Cup ===
East Bengal started the Federation Cup campaign in the Pre-Quarter Finals against State Bank of Travancore and won 2–0 with goals from Syed Rahim Nabi and Alvito D'Cunha. In the quarter-final, however, East Bengal lost 0–1 against Dempo courtesy of a solitary strike from Ranti Martins in the 86th minute as they were eliminated from the competition.

==== Fixtures & results ====
Win Draw Loss

20 December 2006 Pre-Quarter Final	East Bengal	2–0	SBT	Kolkata
	Syed Rahim Nabi 22'; Alvito D'Cunha 39'	Report		Stadium: Salt Lake Stadium; Referee: M.K. Roy

23 December 2006 Quarter-Final	East Bengal	0–1	Dempo	Kolkata
		Report	Ranti Martins 86'	Stadium: Salt Lake Stadium; Referee: S. Suresh

=== National Football League ===
==== League table ====
Pos	Team	Pld	W	D	L	GF	GA	GD	Pts
3	Mahindra United	18	8	6	4	29	14	+15	30
4	Churchill Brothers	18	7	8	3	30	23	+7	29
5	East Bengal	18	7	5	6	29	29	0	26
6	Sporting Clube de Goa	18	6	7	5	23	19	+4	25
7	Air India	18	4	9	5	20	23	−3	21

Source: rsssf.com

==== Fixtures & results ====
Win Draw Loss

7 January 2007 1	Air India	1–0	East Bengal	Mumbai
	Samson Singh 71'	Report		Stadium: Cooperage Ground; Referee: P.K. Bose; Man of the Match: Benoy Kuruvilla (Air India)

11 January 2007 2	HAL	1–3	East Bengal	Bengaluru
	Sampath Kuttymani 49'	Report	Ashim Biswas 5'; Bibiano Fernandes 20'; Arata Izumi 80'	Stadium: Bangalore Football Stadium; Referee: K. Shankar; Man of the Match: Ashim Biswas (East Bengal)

18 January 2007 3	Mohammedan Sporting	1–2	East Bengal	Kolkata
	Habibur Rehman Mondal 52'	Report	Ashim Biswas 33'; Boniface Ambani 58'	Stadium: Barasat Stadium; Referee: K. Shankar; Man of the Match: Shylo Malsawmtluanga (East Bengal)

21 January 2007 4	East Bengal	2–2	Churchill Brothers	Kolkata
	Boniface Ambani 41', 65'	Report	Khanthang Paite 3'; D Raju 83'	Stadium: Salt Lake Stadium; Referee: K Shankar; Man of the Match: D Raju (Churchill Brothers)

19 February 2007 5	JCT	1–2	East Bengal	Ludhiana
	Baldeep Singh 90+2'	Report	Edmilson Marques Pardal 14', 31'	Stadium: Guru Nanak Stadium; Referee: P.K. Bose; Man of the Match: Edmilson Marques Pardal (East Bengal)

24 February 2007 6	East Bengal	0–0	Dempo	Kolkata
		Report		Stadium: Barasat Stadium; Referee: S. Suresh; Man of the Match: Rajat Ghosh Dastidar (East Bengal)

27 January 2007 7	East Bengal	1–0	Mohun Bagan	Kolkata
	Saumik Dey 15'	Report		Stadium: Salt Lake Stadium; Referee: Dinesh Nair; Man of the Match: Jayanta Sen (East Bengal)

16 March 2007 8	Mahindra United	2–2	East Bengal	Mumbai
	Abhishek Yadav 70'; Andrews Pomeyie Mensah 89'	Report	Edmilson Marques Pardal 31', 58'	Stadium: Cooperage Ground; Referee: Dinesh Nair; Man of the Match: Edmilson Marques Pardal (East Bengal)

21 March 2007 9	East Bengal	0–2	Sporting Club de Goa	Kolkata
		Report	Ernest Jeremiah Chukwuma 20', 50'	Stadium: Salt Lake Stadium; Referee: Rizwan Ul-Haq; Man of the Match: Dudu Omagbemi (Sporting Club de Goa)

24 March 2007 10	East Bengal	1–1	Air India	Kolkata
	Edmilson Marques Pardal 90+3'	Report	Samson Singh 73'	Stadium: Salt Lake Stadium; Referee: K. Shankar; Man of the Match: Samson Singh (Air India)

4 April 2007 11	East Bengal	3–2	HAL	Kolkata
	Edmilson Marques Pardal 8', 80'; Boniface Ambani 19'	Report	Sampath Kuttymani 27'; Xavier Vijay Kumar 81'	Stadium: Salt Lake Stadium; Referee: Deepak Kumar Dey; Man of the Match: Xavier Vijay Kumar (HAL)

7 April 2007 12	East Bengal	2–1	Mohammedan Sporting	Kolkata
	Edmilson Marques Pardal 4', 82'	Report	Jatin Singh 8'	Stadium: Salt Lake Stadium; Referee: P. Bhaskar; Man of the Match: Edmilson Marques Pardal (East Bengal)

11 April 2007 13	Churchill Brothers	3–2	East Bengal	Margao
	Vanlal Rova 26'; Odafa Onyeka Okolie 54', 86'	Report	Edmilson Marques Pardal 40'; Alvito D'Cunha 85'	Stadium: Fatorda Stadium; Man of the Match: Mashangva Zenith (Churchill Brothers)

15 April 2007 14	Mohun Bagan	2–1	East Bengal	Kolkata
	Jose Ramirez Barreto 45+2'; Douglas da Silva 71'	Report	Edmilson Marques Pardal 30' (pen.)	Stadium: Salt Lake Stadium; Referee: Rizwan Ul-Haq; Man of the Match: Jose Ramirez Barreto (Mohun Bagan)

22 April 2007 15	Dempo	5–3	East Bengal	Margao
	Beto 2', 73'; Ranti Martins 19', 86'; John Dias 84'; Creson Antao (red card) 90+3'	Report	Edmilson Marques Pardal 32', 46' (red card) 90+3'; Ashim Biswas 44'	Stadium: Fatorda Stadium; Referee: Shaji Kurian; Man of the Match: Beto (Dempo)

25 April 2007 16	Sporting Club de Goa	1–1	East Bengal	Margao
	Ernest Jeremiah Chukwuma 6'	Report	Ashim Biswas 80'	Stadium: Fatorda Stadium; Referee: Rizwan Ul-Haw; Man of the Match: Ashim Biswas (East Bengal)

15 May 2007 17	East Bengal	2–1	Mahindra United	Kolkata
	Boniface Ambani 45', 52'	Report	Andrews Pomeyie Mensah 28'	Stadium: Salt Lake Stadium; Referee: S. Suresh; Man of the Match: Boniface Ambani (East Bengal)

19 May 2007 18	East Bengal	2–3	JCT	Kolkata
	Boniface Ambani 10'; Ashim Biswas 52'	Report	Chidi Edeh 5', 33'; Sunil Chhetri 30'	Stadium: Barasat Stadium; Referee: Rizwan Ul-Haq; Man of the Match: Chidi Edeh (JCT)

== Super Soccer Series 2007 (Friendly) ==
Brazilian giants São Paulo football club toured India for a series of friendly matches in January 2007. East Bengal played them on 27 January 2007 at the Kanchenjunga Stadium in Siliguri and lost 0–3 with goals from Carlinhos, Paulo Matos and Jean Raphael Moreira.

=== Fixtures & results ===
Win Draw Loss

27 January 2006 Friendly	East Bengal	0–3	São Paulo	Siliguri
		Report	Carlinhos 35'; Paulo Matos 59'; Jean Raphael Moreira 90+3'	Stadium: Kanchenjunga Stadium; Referee: Rizwan Ul-Haq

== Statistics ==
=== Appearances ===
Only for competitive fixtures.
Players with no appearances are not included in the list.

Appearances for East Bengal in 2006–07 season
No.	Pos.	Nat.	Name	CFL		NFL		Fed Cup		Durand Cup		IFA Shield		Total	
No.	Pos.	Nat.	Name	Apps	Starts	Apps	Starts	Apps	Starts	Apps	Starts	Apps	Starts	Apps	Starts
Goalkeepers
21	GK	(India)	Abhra Mondal	7	7	6	6	0	0	1	1	0	0	14	14
24	GK	(India)	Rajat Ghosh Dastidar	7	7	8	8	0	0	2	2	0	0	17	17
1	GK	(India)	Naseem Akhtar	0	0	5	4	2	2	0	0	2	2	9	8
Defenders
17	DF	(India)	Surya Bikash Chakraborty	1	1	2	2							3	3
4	DF	(India)	Covan Lawrence	5	4	12	12							17	16
27	DF	(India)	Gurpreet Singh	11	10	4	4	1	0	3	3	2	1	21	18
29	DF	(India)	Saumik Dey	11	11	10	10	2	2	3	3	2	2	28	28
19	DF	(India)	Syed Rahim Nabi	9	8	9	9	2	2	0	0	0	0	20	19
5	DF	(India)	Debabrata Roy	6	4	7	7	2	1	0	0	0	0	15	12
20	DF	(India)	Vincent Pires	13	11	6	6	0	0	2	2	0	0	21	19
12	DF	(India)	Anupam Sarkar	4	3	2	1	2	2	0	0	1	1	9	7
	DF	(India)	Yumnam Raju	3	1	0	0	0	0	2	0	0	0	5	1
2	DF	(India)	Muttah Suresh	6	6	13	13	0	0	3	3	1	1	23	23
3	DF	(Brazil)	Luis Octavio da Silva	11	11									11	11
3	DF	(Brazil)	Cristiano Hilario de Oliveira			14	14	2	2			1	1	17	17
26	DF	(India)	Gurjinder Singh									1	1	1	1
34	DF	(India)	Amulya Mondal							1	1	1	0	2	1
Midfielders
7	MF	(India)	Jayanta Sen	7	7	14	14	2	2	3	2	2	2	28	27
6	MF	(India)	Dipankar Roy	13	10	9	2	2	2	1	1	1	1	26	16
9	MF	(India)	Alvito D'Cunha	4	3	14	12	1	1	2	2	2	2	23	20
15	MF	(India)	Bibiano Fernandes	7	1	8	5	0	0	2	2	1	1	18	9
14	MF	(India)	Chandan Das	12	11	9	5	1	0	2	2	0	0	24	18
32	MF	(India)	Gouranga Dutta	6	1			0	0	0	0	2	1	8	2
30	MF	(India)	Snehasish Chakraborty	9	8	3	2	0	0	0	0	0	0	12	10
8	MF	(India)	Sasthi Duley	5	3	5	4	2	2	0	0	1	1	13	10
	MF	(India)	Mohammed Mukhtar	3	1									3	1
11	MF	(India)	Hardeep Singh Saini	1	0	4	4			1	1	0	0	6	5
28	MF	(India)	Shylo Malsawmtluanga			17	12	2	2			2	1	21	15
32	MF	(Japan)	Arata Izumi			12	7	2	2	2	0			16	9
40	MF	(Brazil)	Daniel Carlos Jorge							3	3	2	2	5	5
26	MF	(India)	Sovan Chakraborty			1	0							1	0
Forwards
23	FW	(India)	Vimal Pariyar	5	1	2	1	0	0	3	2	0	0	10	4
25	FW	(India)	Ashim Biswas	9	8	11	5	1	0	0	0	2	0	23	13
22	FW	(India)	Fredy Mascarenhas	11	10	4	0	1	0	3	1	0	0	19	11
10	FW	(Brazil)	Marcio Fernandes Tomaz	6	6									6	6
10	FW	(Brazil)	Thiago S Ferreira da Costa							2	2	2	2	4	4
10	FW	(Kenya)	Boniface Ambani			17	17							17	17
30	FW	(Brazil)	Edmilson Marques Pardal			12	12							12	12

=== Goal scorers ===
Goals for East Bengal in 2006–07 season
Rank	No.	Pos.	Nat.	Name	CFL	NFL	Fed Cup	Durand Cup	IFA Shield	Total
1	30	FW	(Brazil)	Edmilson Marques Pardal		13				13
2	9	MF	(India)	Alvito D'Cunha	4	1	1	1	1	8
2	25	FW	(India)	Ashim Biswas	3	5	0	0	0	8
4	10	FW	(Kenya)	Boniface Ambani		7				7
5	19	DF	(India)	Syed Rahim Nabi	2	0	1	0	0	3
6	14	MF	(India)	Chandan Das	2	0	0	0	0	2
6	20	DF	(India)	Vincent Pires	2	0	0	0	0	2
6	29	DF	(India)	Saumik Dey	1	1	0	0	0	2
9	3	DF	(Brazil)	Luis Octavio da Silva	1					1
9	6	MF	(India)	Dipankar Roy	1	0	0	0	0	1
9	10	FW	(Brazil)	Marcio Fernandes Tomaz	1					1
9	15	MF	(India)	Bibiano Fernandes	0	1	0	0	0	1
9	22	FW	(India)	Fredy Mascarenhas	1	0	0	0	0	1
9	32	MF	(Japan)	Arata Izumi		1	0	0		1
9		DF	(India)	Yumnam Raju	1	0	0	0	0	1
Own goals					1	0	0	0	0	1
Total					20	29	2	1	1	53
