= 2007–08 East Bengal FC season =

Indian football club season

East Bengal
2007–08 season
- President: Dr Pranab Dasgupta
- Head-Coach: (India) Subrata Bhattacharya (until 16 January 2008) (India) Monoranjan Bhattacharya (until 19 February 2008) (India) Aloke Mukherjee (from 20 February 2008)
- Ground: Salt Lake Stadium; Barasat Stadium; East Bengal Ground
- I-League: 6th
- Calcutta Football League: Runners-up
- Federation Cup: Champions
- Super Cup: Runners-up
- IFA Shield: Group Stage
- AFC Cup: Group Stage
- Top goalscorer: League: Edmilson (8); All: Edmilson (29)
Home colours	Away colours

The 2007–08 season was East Bengal's 1st season in the I-League and 88th season in existence.

== Competitions ==
=== Overall ===
Competition	First match	Last match	Final position
Calcutta Football League	30 July 2007	18 November 2007	Runners-up
Federation Cup	4 September 2007	15 September 2007	Champions
I-League	25 November 2007	23 February 2008	6th
Super Cup	27 February 2008		Runners-up
IFA Shield	1 March 2008	3 March 2008	Group Stage
AFC Cup	11 March 2008	14 May 2008	Group Stage

=== Overview ===
Competition	Record							
Competition	Pld	W	D	L	GF	GA	GD	Win %
Calcutta Football League	14	8	2	4	30	16	+14	57.14
Federation Cup	4	4	0	0	11	6	+5	100.00
I-League	18	5	4	9	17	23	−6	27.78
Super Cup	1	0	0	1	0	1	−1	0.00
IFA Shield	2	0	1	1	1	3	−2	0.00
AFC Cup	6	2	1	3	5	6	−1	33.33
Total	45	19	8	18	64	55	+9	42.22

Last updated: 1 June 2008
Source: Competitions

=== Calcutta Football League ===
East Bengal finished the 2007 Calcutta Premier Division as runner-up with 26 points from 14 matches behind champions Mohun Bagan.

==== Fixtures & results ====
Win Draw Loss

30 July 2007 1	East Bengal	2–0	Calcutta Port Trust	Kolkata
	Mehtab Hussain 8'; Edmilson Marques Pardal 10'	Report		Stadium: East Bengal Ground; Referee: Rathin Mukherjee

3 August 2007 2	East Bengal	2–0	Eastern Railway	Kolkata
	Edmilson Marques Pardal 70' (pen.); Dipendu Biswas 86'	Report		Stadium: East Bengal Ground; Referee: Debashish Mishra

7 August 2007 3	East Bengal	6–2	Mohammedan Sporting	Kolkata
	Edmilson Marques Pardal 4', 42', 72'; Ashim Biswas 46', 48'; Alvito D'Cunha 55'	Report	Basudeb Mondal 2'; K Shyju 19'	Stadium: Salt Lake Stadium; Referee: Minangshu Bhattacharya

14 August 2007 4	East Bengal	3–0	Peerless	Kolkata
	Abdul Samed Okocha 16'; Alvito D'Cunha 50'; Dipankar Roy 57'	Report		Stadium: East Bengal Ground; Referee: Udayan Haldar

17 August 2007 5	East Bengal	3–4	Mohun Bagan	Kolkata
	Alvito D'Cunha 46', 60'; Edmilson Marques Pardal 69' (pen.)	Report	Lalawmpuia Pachuau 9'; Jose Ramirez Barreto 34' (pen.); Shanmugam Venkatesh 42', 47'	Stadium: Salt Lake Stadium; Referee: Subrata Sarkar

22 August 2007 6	East Bengal	1–0	George Telegraph	Kolkata
	Ashim Biswas 7'	Report		Stadium: East Bengal Ground; Referee: Dhanapati Roy

25 August 2007 7	East Bengal	1–1	Chirag United	Kolkata
	Vimal Pariyar 14'	Report	Sashti Duley 13'	Stadium: Salt Lake Stadium; Referee: K Shankar

1 October 2007 8	Calcutta Port Trust	0–5	East Bengal	Kolkata
		Report	Dipankar Roy 3'; Edmilson Marques Pardal 36', 39', 59' (pen.), 80'	Stadium: Salt Lake Stadium; Referee: Biplab Poddar

3 October 2007 9	Eastern Railway	0–1	East Bengal	Howrah
		Report	Jayanta Sen 27'	Stadium: Sailen Manna Stadium; Referee: Pradip Mukherjee

6 October 2007 10	Mohammedan Sporting	2–1	East Bengal	Kolkata
	Adebayo Tokunbo Adewusi 2'; Kalia Kulothungan 80'	Report	Edmilson Marques Pardal 32'	Stadium: Salt Lake Stadium; Referee: Rathin Mukherjee

27 October 2007 11	Peerless	0–2	East Bengal	Kolkata
		Report	Edmilson Marques Pardal 57'; Vimal Pariyar 74'	Stadium: East Bengal Ground; Referee: Pradip Mukherjee

6 November 2007 12	Mohun Bagan	2–0	East Bengal	Kolkata
	Jose Ramirez Barreto 49', 90+2'	Report		Stadium: Salt Lake Stadium; Referee: S Suresh

15 November 2007 13	George Telegraph	3–1	East Bengal	Kolkata
	Nuruddin Saleh Olawale 24', 33'; Gour Naskar 29'	Report	Ashim Biswas 40'	Stadium: Salt Lake Stadium; Referee: Kashinath Sen

18 November 2007 14	Chirag United	2–2	East Bengal	Kolkata
	Shankar Oraon 44'; Theodore Sunday Wrobeh 61'	Report	Syed Rahim Nabi 16'; Ashim Biswas 76'	Stadium: Salt Lake Stadium; Referee: Dhanapati Roy

=== Federation Cup ===
East Bengal started the Federation Cup campaign in the Pre-Quarter Finals against Kolkata giants Mohammedan Sporting and won 3–1 with Ashim Biswas putting them ahead in the 21st minute. Kalia Kulothungan equalised for Mohammedan but Edmilson Marques Pardal scored twice to take the team to the last 8. In the Quarter-Final, East Bengal faced hosts JCT and won 3–2 with another brace from Edmilson after Irungbam Surkumar Singh put them ahead in the 14th minute. Eduardo da Silva Escobar and Renedy Singh scored for JCT. In the Semi-Final, East Bengal faced arch-rivals Mohun Bagan. Bhaichung Bhutia put Mohun Bagan ahead in the 12th minute but East Bengal rallied from behind to score three. Surkumar Singh equalised in the 25th minute while Dipendu Biswas and Ashim Biswas scored the other two. José Ramirez Barreto's goal in the 71st minute wasn't enough for Bagan as East Bengal won 3–2 to reach the final. In the Final, East Bengal defeated Mahindra United 2–1 with another brace from Brazilian forward Edmilson as they lifted their 5th Federation Cup title.

==== Bracket ====
Pre-Quarter Finals
4 September
JCT	3
Vasco	1
4 September
Mohammedan Sporting	1
East Bengal	3
6 September
Air India	1
Viva Kerala	2
6 September
ONGC	1
Mohun Bagan	2
7 September
Dempo	3
Chirag United	0
7 September
Salgaocar	1
Churchill Brothers	4
5 September
Mahindra United	1
HAL	0
5 September
Army XI	0
Sporting Clube de Goa	1

Quarter-Finals
9 September
JCT	2
East Bengal	3
9 September
Viva Kerala	1
Mohun Bagan	3
10 September
Dempo	2
Churchill Brothers	0
8 September
Mahindra United	1 (5)
Sporting Clube de Goa	1 (4)

Semi-Finals
11 September
East Bengal	3
Mohun Bagan	2
12 September
Dempo	1 (1)
Mahindra United	1 (3)

Final
5 September
East Bengal	2
Mahindra United	1

==== Fixtures & results ====
Win Draw Loss

4 September 2007 Pre-Quarter Final	Mohammedan Sporting	1–3	East Bengal	Ludhiana
	Kalia Kulothungan 45+3'	Report	Ashim Biswas 21'; Edmilson Marques Pardal 51', 66'	Stadium: Guru Nanak Stadium; Referee: S. Suresh

9 September 2007 Quarter-Final	JCT	2–3	East Bengal	Ludhiana
	Eduardo da Silva Escobar 51'; Renedy Singh 90+5'	Report	Irungbam Surkumar Singh 14'; Edmilson Marques Pardal 44', 72'	Stadium: Guru Nanak Stadium; Referee: Benjamin D'Silva

11 September 2007 Semi-Final^{(KD)}	East Bengal	3–2	Mohun Bagan	Ludhiana
	Irungbam Surkumar Singh 25'; Dipendu Biswas 35'; Ashim Biswas 47'	Report	Bhaichung Bhutia 12'; Jose Ramirez Barreto 71'	Stadium: Guru Nanak Stadium; Referee: K. Shankar

15 September 2007 Final	East Bengal	2–1	Mahindra United	Ludhiana
	Edmilson Marques Pardal 36' (pen.), 45+1'	Report	Sunil Kumar (red card) 42'; Manjit Singh 45+3'	Stadium: Guru Nanak Stadium; Referee: K. Shankar

=== I League ===
==== League table ====
Pos	Team	Pld	W	D	L	GF	GA	GD	Pts	Qualification or relegation
4	Mohun Bagan	18	8	6	4	22	17	+5	30	2009 AFC Cup group stage (Note: Mohun Bagan qualified for the 2009 AFC Cup as 2008 Indian Federation Cup winners.)
5	Mahindra United	18	7	7	4	24	18	+6	28	
6	East Bengal	18	5	4	9	17	23	−6	19	
7	Sporting Goa	18	4	7	7	14	24	−10	19	
8	Air India	18	3	8	7	10	20	−10	17	

Source: Soccerway
Rules for classification: 1) points; 2) goal difference; 3) number of goals scored.

==== Fixtures & results ====
Win Draw Loss

25 November 2007 1	East Bengal	2–0	Viva Kerala	Kolkata
17:30 IST	Edmilson Marques Pardal 73'; Alvito D'Cunha 79'	Report		Stadium: Barasat Stadium; Referee: A. Arjunan; Man of the Match: Jayanta Sen (East Bengal)

30 November 2007 2	East Bengal	1–3	JCT	Kolkata
17:30 IST	Edmilson Marques Pardal 50' (pen.)	Report	Eduardo da Silva Escobar 43', 67', 83'	Stadium: Salt Lake Stadium; Referee: Benjamin D'Silva; Man of the Match: Eduardo da Silva Escobar (JCT)

3 December 2007 3	East Bengal	3–2	Salgaocar	Kolkata
17:30 IST	Edmilson Marques Pardal 20', 66' (pen.); Ashim Biswas 53'	Report	TV Biju Kumar 49'; Shylo Malsawmtluanga 75'; Remu Gomes (red card) 60'	Stadium: Salt Lake Stadium; Referee: P.K. Bose; Man of the Match: Felix Chimaokwu (Salgaocar)

9 December 2007 4	Dempo	2–2	East Bengal	Margao
15:30 IST	Valeriano Rebello 26'; Beto 86'	Report	MacDonald Mukansi 25'; Edmilson Marques Pardal 59'	Stadium: Fatorda Stadium; Referee: Ali Saleem; Man of the Match: Subrata Paul (East Bengal)

13 December 2007 5	Churchill Brothers	3–2	East Bengal	Margao
15:30 IST	Odafa Onyeka Okolie 32', 41' (pen.), 44'	Report	Edmilson Marques Pardal 26'; Mehtab Hossain 87'	Stadium: Fatorda Stadium; Referee: Ali Saleem; Man of the Match: Odafa Onyeka Okolie (Churchill Brothers)

17 December 2007 6	Air India	1–0	East Bengal	Mumbai
15:30 IST	Paresh Shivalkar 62'	Report		Stadium: Cooperage Ground; Referee: Benjamin D'Silva; Man of the Match: Paresh Shivalkar (Air India)

23 December 2007 7	Mahindra United	2–1	East Bengal	Mumbai
15:30 IST	Debabrata Roy 31' (o.g.); Mohammed Rafi 72'	Report	Edmilson Marques Pardal 50'	Stadium: Cooperage Ground; Referee: S Suresh; Man of the Match: Sushanth Mathew (Mahindra United)

30 December 2007 8	Mohun Bagan	1–0	East Bengal	Kolkata
16:00 IST	Baichung Bhutia 61'	Report		Stadium: Salt Lake Stadium; Referee: K Shankar; Man of the Match: Douglas da Silva (Mohun Bagan)

5 January 2008 9	Sporting Clube de Goa	1–0	East Bengal	Margao
15:30 IST	Lawrence Adjei 52'	Report		Stadium: Fatorda Stadium; Referee: Dinesh Nair; Man of the Match: Denzil Franco (Sporting Clube de Goa)

8 January 2008 10	Salgaocar	0–0	East Bengal	Margao
16:00 IST		Report		Stadium: Fatorda Stadium; Referee: Rizwan Ul-Haq; Man of the Match: Fabio Dos Passos (Salgaocar)

14 January 2008 11	JCT	3–0	East Bengal	Ludhiana
13:30 IST	Baljit Sahni 5'; Baldeep Singh 8'; Eduardo da Silva Escobar 38'	Report		Stadium: Guru Nanak Stadium; Referee: A. Arjunan; Man of the Match: Baljit Sahni (JCT)

21 January 2008 12	East Bengal	0–2	Mohun Bagan	Kolkata
16:00 IST		Report	Bhaichung Bhutia 29', 62'; Douglas da Silva (yellow card) 9' (yellow-red card) 48'	Stadium: Salt Lake Stadium; Referee: Dinesh Nair; Man of the Match: Bhaichung Bhutia (Mohun Bagan)

27 January 2008 13	East Bengal	1–0	Dempo	Kolkata
18:00 IST	Mahesh Gawli 69' (o.g.)	Report		Stadium: Salt Lake Stadium; Referee: Dinesh Nair; Man of the Match: Alvito D'Cunha (East Bengal)

30 January 2008 14	East Bengal	0–0	Air India	Kolkata
18:00 IST		Report		Stadium: Salt Lake Stadium; Referee: K Shankar; Man of the Match: Arnab Das Sharma (Air India)

3 February 2008 15	East Bengal	1–0	Mahindra United	Kolkata
18:00 IST	Syed Rahim Nabi 5'	Report		Stadium: Salt Lake Stadium; Referee: Dinesh Nair; Man of the Match: Syed Rahim Nabi (East Bengal)

10 February 2008 16	East Bengal	0–1	Churchill Brothers	Kolkata
18:00 IST	Jayanta Sen (red card) 29'	Report	Mboyo Iyomi 77'	Stadium: Salt Lake Stadium; Referee: A. Arjunan; Man of the Match: Subrata Paul (East Bengal)

17 February 2008 17	Viva Kerala	1–3	East Bengal	Kozhikode
15:30 IST	Syed Rahim Nabi 20'; Alvito D'Cunha 57'; Edmilson Marques Pardal 90'	Report	Ebin Rose 45+1'	Stadium: EMS Stadium; Referee: Rizwan Ul-Haq; Man of the Match: Syed Rahim Nabi (East Bengal)

23 February 2008 18	East Bengal	1–1	Sporting Club de Goa	Kolkata
15:30 IST	Syed Rahim Nabi 56'	Report	Joseph Pereira 21'	Stadium: Barasat Stadium; Referee: P.K. Bose; Man of the Match: Syed Rahim Nabi (East Bengal)

=== Super Cup ===
2007 Federation Cup Champion East Bengal faced 2007-08 I-League Champion Dempo in the 2008 Super Cup. Dempo won 1–0 courtesy of a solitary goal from Chidi Edeh.

==== Fixtures & results ====
Win Draw Loss

27 February 2008	Dempo	1–0	East Bengal	Gurgaon
14:30 IST	Chidi Edeh 71'	Report		Stadium: Tau Devi Lal Stadium; Referee: Dinesh Nair

=== IFA Shield ===
Group B

Team	Pld	W	D	L	GF	GA	GD	Pts
(South Africa) Santos	2	1	1	0	3	1	+2	4
(India) Mahindra United	2	1	0	1	2	2	0	3
(India) East Bengal	2	0	1	1	1	3	−2	1

Source: 113th IFA Shield 2008

East Bengal was grouped alongside Mahindra United and Santos in Group B. East Bengal lost 2–0 against Mahindra United in the opening game and drew 1–1 against Santos as they were eliminated from the group stages.

==== Fixtures & results ====
Win Draw Loss

1 March 2008 Group Stage	East Bengal	0–2	Mahindra United	Kolkata
15:00 IST		Report	Rafi 37'; Yusif Yakubu 44'	Stadium: Barasat Stadium; Referee: Mohammed Kamil

3 March 2008 Group Stage	East Bengal	1–1	Santos	Howrah
15:00 IST	Edmilson Marques Pardal 14' (pen.)	Report	Gregory Michael 7'	Stadium: Sailen Manna Stadium; Referee: A. Arjunan

=== AFC Cup ===
==== Group stage ====
Pos	Team	Pld	W	D	L	GF	GA	GD	Pts	Qualification
1	(Lebanon) Safa	6	2	4	0	8	6	+2	10	Advance to Knockout stage
2	(Jordan) Al-Wahdat	6	1	4	1	12	12	0	7	
3	(India) East Bengal	6	2	1	3	5	6	−1	7	
4	(Yemen) Ahli Sanaa Club	6	1	3	2	3	4	−1	6	

Source: RSSSF

==== Fixtures & results ====
Win Draw Loss

11 March 2008	Safa (Lebanon)	1–0	(India) East Bengal	Sports City Stadium, Beirut
18:00 UTC+3	Bernard Mbassi 17'	(Report) (Report)		Attendance: 700; Referee: (Oman) Mahmood Mohd Juma Al Ghatrifi

18 March 2008	East Bengal (India)	1–0	(Yemen) Al-Ahli San‘a’	Salt Lake Stadium, Kolkata
15:00 UTC+5:30	Edmilson Marques Pardal 31'	(Report) (Report)		Attendance: 6,000; Referee: (Japan) Minoru Tōjō

3 April 2008	Al-Wahdat (Jordan)	0–2	(India) East Bengal	Prince Mohammad Stadium, Zarqa
15:30 UTC+3		(Report) (Report)	Alvito D'Cunha 58'; Ikechukwu Gift Ibe 69'	Attendance: 4,000; Referee: (Malaysia) Rosdi Shaharul

16 April 2008	East Bengal (India)	2–4	(Jordan) Al-Wahdat	Salt Lake Stadium, Kolkata
15:00 UTC+5:30	Syed Rahim Nabi 12'; Edmilson Marques Pardal 28'	(Report) (Report)	Ra'fat Ali 6' 24'; Hassan Abdel Fattah 31' 34'	Attendance: 10,000; Referee: (Vietnam) Vo Minh Tri

30 April 2008	East Bengal (India)	0–0	(Lebanon) Safa	Salt Lake Stadium, Kolkata, India
15:00 UTC+5:30		(Report)		Attendance: 10,000; Referee: (Uzbekistan) Valentin Kovalenko

14 May 2008	Al-Ahli San‘a’ (Yemen)	1 –0	(India) East Bengal	Ali Mohsen Al-Muraisi Stadium, Sana'a
16:15 UTC+3	Ali Al Nono 43'	(Report)		Attendance: 1,000; Referee: (Tajikistan) Dilovarshokh Orzuev

== Statistics ==
=== Appearances ===
Players with no appearances are not included in the list.

Appearances for East Bengal in 2007–08 season
No.	Pos.	Nat.	Name	CFL		I League		Fed Cup		Super Cup		IFA Shield		AFC Cup		Total	
No.	Pos.	Nat.	Name	Apps	Starts	Apps	Starts	Apps	Starts	Apps	Starts	Apps	Starts	Apps	Starts	Apps	Starts
Goalkeepers
24	GK	(India)	Subrata Paul	3	3	16	16	4	4	1	1	1	1	6	6	31	31
21	GK	(India)	Abhra Mondal	6	6	2	2	0	0	0	0	1	1	0	0	9	9
31	GK	(India)	Arup Debnath	2	1	0	0	0	0			0	0	0	0	2	1
33	GK	(India)	Gopal Das	4	4	0	0	0	0			0	0	0	0	4	4
Defenders
19	DF	(India)	Syed Rahim Nabi	3	3	18	18	4	4	1	1	2	2	6	6	34	34
5	DF	(India)	Debabrata Roy	3	3	15	14	2	2	1	1	2	2	5	5	28	27
26	DF	(India)	Mehrajuddin Wadoo	3	3	14	12	4	4	1	1	2	1	6	6	30	27
3	DF	(Nigeria)	Majek Bolaji	5	5	13	13	4	4	0	0	1	1	6	6	29	29
12	DF	(India)	Anupam Sarkar	9	4	10	8	0	0	1	1	2	2	1	1	23	16
4	DF	(Kenya)	Julius Owino			10	10			1	1					11	11
29	DF	(India)	Saumik Dey	10	9	9	8	3	3	0	0	1	0	0	0	23	20
27	DF	(India)	Surkumar Singh	1	1	9	9	4	4	1	1	2	2	6	6	23	23
42	DF	(India)	Madhab Das	5	5	4	3	0	0			0	0	0	0	9	8
2	DF	(India)	Muttah Suresh	9	9	3	3	4	4			2	1	5	5	23	22
35	DF	(India)	Aiborlang Khongjee	5	5	2	1	0	0							7	6
39	DF	(India)	Ratan Das	2	1	2	0									4	1
17	DF	(Ghana)	Abdul Samad Okocha	4	4			3	0							7	4
4	DF	(India)	Gurpreet Singh	8	6			0	0							8	6
17	DF	(India)	Surya Bikash Chakraborty	4	3	2	2			0	0	0	0			6	5
20	DF	(India)	Napoleon Singh	1	1											1	1
	DF	(India)	Poibang Pohshna	0	0									1	1	1	1
Midfielders
9	MF	(India)	Alvito D'Cunha	10	8	17	16	4	4	1	1	2	2	6	6	40	37
23	MF	(India)	Mehtab Hossain	7	7	17	15	0	0	1	1	2	1	6	6	33	30
7	MF	(India)	Jayanta Sen	12	12	12	12	4	4	1	1	1	1	3	2	33	32
32	MF	(India)	Snehasish Chakraborty	4	2	11	4	0	0	1	0	2	0	6	0	24	6
6	MF	(India)	Dipankar Roy	13	10	9	2	2	0							24	12
37	MF	(South Africa)	MacDonald Mukansi	1	1	9	6									10	7
14	MF	(India)	Chandan Das	5	4	4	1									9	5
11	MF	(India)	Hardeep Singh Saini	3	1	1	1	0	0					2	0	6	2
40	MF	(India)	Vanlal Rova	4	1	5	2			0	0			0	0	9	3
15	MF	(Ghana)	Ikechukwu Ibe Gift									1	1	6	5	7	6
37	MF	(India)	Marlanki Suiting	6	3											6	3
36	MF	(India)	Sovon Chakraborty	1	0											1	0
34	MF	(India)	Amulya Mondal	2	1											2	1
	MF	(India)	Mohammed Mukhtar	1	0											1	0
	MF	(India)	Vinu Jose	0	0									1	0	1	0
Forwards
30	FW	(Brazil)	Edmilson Marques Pardal	12	12	14	14	3	3	1	1	2	2	5	5	37	37
10	FW	(India)	Dipendu Biswas	11	2	8	2	3	0			0	0	2	0	24	4
25	FW	(India)	Ashim Biswas	13	13	5	4	4	4							22	21
22	FW	(India)	Vimal Pariyar	3	1	3	0			0	0			0	0	6	1
8	FW	(Nigeria)	Abeeku Gaiesi									2	2			2	2

=== Goal scorers ===
Goals for East Bengal in 2007–08 season
Rank	No.	Pos.	Nat.	Name	CFL	I League	Fed Cup	Super Cup	IFA Shield	AFC Cup	Total
1	30	FW	(Brazil)	Edmilson Marques Pardal	12	8	6	0	1	2	29
2	25	FW	(India)	Ashim Biswas	5	1	2	0	0		8
3	9	MF	(India)	Alvito D'Cunha	4	2	0	0	0	1	7
4	19	DF	(India)	Syed Rahim Nabi	1	3	0	0	0	1	5
5	6	MF	(India)	Dipankar Roy	2	0	0	0	0		2
5	10	FW	(India)	Dipendu Biswas	1	0	1	0	0	0	2
5	22	FW	(India)	Vimal Pariyar	2	0		0	0	0	2
5	23	MF	(India)	Mehtab Hossain	1	1	0	0	0	0	2
5	27	DF	(India)	Surkumar Singh	0	0	2	0	0	0	2
10	7	MF	(India)	Jayanta Sen	1	0	0	0	0	0	1
10	15	MF	(Ghana)	Ikechukwu Ibe Gift					0	1	1
10	17	DF	(Ghana)	Abdul Samad Okocha	1		0				1
10	37	MF	(India)	MacDonald Mukansi	0	1					1
Own goals					0	1	0	0	0	0	1
Total					30	17	11	0	1	5	64
