= 2006–07 Santosh Trophy =

61st Santosh Trophy

Tournament details
- Country: India
- Teams: 31

Final positions
- Champions: Punjab (7th title)
- Runners-up: West Bengal

Tournament statistics
- Top goal scorer: (India)

The 61st Santosh Trophy 2006 was held from 14 September to 25 October 2006 in Gurgaon & Faridabad, Haryana.

== Qualifying rounds ==
Venues:

- Ch. Devi Lal Sports Complex, Sector 38; Gurgaon
- HUDA Sports Complex, Sector 12; Faridabad

=== Cluster I - Gurgaon ===
Team	Pld	W	D	L	GF	GA	GD	Pts
Haryana	2	1	1	0	3	0	+3	4
Bihar	2	1	1	0	1	0	+1	4
Pondicherry	2	0	0	2	0	4	−4	0

14 September 2006: Haryana 3-0 Pondicherry

[10 Habeeb Khan, 32 Sunit Mishra, 54 Praveen Arora]

16 September 2006: Bihar 1-0 Pondicherry

[70 Niranjan Kumar Patel]

18 September 2006: Haryana 0-0 Bihar

=== Cluster II - Gurgaon ===
Team	Pld	W	D	L	GF	GA	GD	Pts
Meghalaya	3	3	0	0	11	1	+10	9
Uttar Pradesh	3	2	0	1	7	6	+1	6
Mizoram	3	1	0	2	6	4	+2	3
Andaman & Nicobar Islands	3	0	0	3	0	13	−13	0

15 September 2006: Meghalaya 1-0 Mizoram

[70 Rocus Lamare]

15 September 2006: Uttar Pradesh 3-0 Andaman&Nicobar Islands

[12 Mohammed Hadi Hassan Khan, 63 Peter Siddiqui, 89 Jatin Singh Bisht]

17 September 2006: Uttar Pradesh 3-1 Mizoram

[U: ?? Amit Singh, 76 Pralad Singh Rawat, 80 Jatin Singh Bisht; M: 48 Lalsangliana]

17 September 2006: Meghalaya 5-0 Andaman&Nicobar Islands

[32 Roland Pyngrope, 56,67 Rocus Lamare, 80,82 Niwamo Gaiphoh]

19 September 2006: Uttar Pradesh 1-5 Meghalaya

[U: 76 Amit Singh; M: 13,29 Newan-o-Gathpoh, 22 Marlanki Suting, 61 Romeo Sukhlein, 80 Roland Pyngrope]

19 September 2006: Mizoram 5-0 Andaman&Nicobar Islands

[12,58 Sochungmi Releng, 25 Jerry Zirsanga, 29,63 Shylo Malswam Tulunga]

=== Cluster III - Faridabad ===
Pos	Team	Pld	W	D	L	GF	GA	GD	Pts
1	West Bengal	2	2	0	0	13	1	+12	6
2	Madhya Pradesh	2	1	0	1	8	5	+3	3
3	Rajasthan	2	0	0	2	1	16	−15	0

14 September 2006: West Bengal 8-1 Rajasthan

[B: 8 Sasthi Duley, 15 Suman Datta, 26,34 Tarif Ahmed, 47,56,66,88 Vimal Pariyar; R: 42 Shakir Ahmed]

16 September 2006: Rajasthan 0-8 Madhya Pradesh

[2,71,90+1 Rahmat Beg, 18,50 V. Shibu, 62 Praveen Nair, 73,77 Suresh Rajak]

18 September 2006: West Bengal 5-0 Madhya Pradesh

[9 Avinash Thapa, 11,34,66 Vimal Pariyar, 45+1 Lalhmang Zuala]

=== Cluster IV - Faridabad ===
Pos	Team	Pld	W	D	L	GF	GA	GD	Pts
1	Services	3	2	1	0	12	3	+9	7
2	Assam	3	2	1	0	7	4	+3	7
3	Chandigarh	3	1	0	2	5	6	−1	3
4	Sikkim	3	0	0	3	5	16	−11	0

15 September 2006: Assam 5-3 Sikkim

[A: 5,14 Robijit Jigdung, 30 Abel Sema, 38 Birjab Mushahary, 90 Akum Ao; S: 48 Bir Bahadur Pradhan, 72 Chunku Sherpa, 81 Ruben Rai]

15 September 2006: Chandigarh 1-4 Services

[C: 89 Deepak Hooda; S: 42 MG Ramachandran, 53 N Gerneilal, 63 A Thirunavakarasu, 70 Shaji A D'Silva]

17 September 2006: Chandigarh 0-1 Assam

[37 Bulu Jindung]

17 September 2006: Services 7-1 Sikkim

[Se: 3,21,44 Ngurneilal, 11  Shaji D' Silva, 22 Trvdaya Raj, 39 Vivek Venu Gopal, 67 A Thirunavakarsu; Si: 53 Sanju Pradhan]

19 September 2006: Chandigarh 4-1 Sikkim

[C: 16 Sameer Singh, 55 Bhupender Gosain, 71 Harminder Singh, 78 Karthik Bhardwaj; S: 23 Tenzing Chepel]

19 September 2006: Assam 1-1 Services

[A: 62 Sanjiva Rongpi; S: 90+3 CT Sajith]

=== Cluster V - Gurgaon ===
Pos	Team	Pld	W	D	L	GF	GA	GD	Pts
1	Chhattisgarh	3	1	2	0	8	1	+7	5
2	Andhra Pradesh	3	1	2	0	5	1	+4	5
3	Manipur	3	1	2	0	3	0	+3	5
4	Himachal Pradesh	3	0	0	3	0	14	−14	0

22 September 2006: Manipur 3-0 Himachal Pradesh

[14 T Narender Meetei, 31 Bungo Singh, 90+1 Bijen Singh]

22 September 2006: Chhattisgarh 1-1 Andhra Pradesh

[C: 18 Deepangshu Mazumder; A: 43 Mohammed Quizar]

24 September 2006: Manipur 0-0 Andhra Pradesh 24 September 2006: Chhattisgarh 7-0 Himachal Pradesh

[24 Abid Khan, 35,88 Kulwant Singh, 40 Subir Maji, 42 Tajuddin, 53,61 Ramchandra Murmu]

26 September 2006: Andhra Pradesh 4-0 Himachal Pradesh

[26,34 Ayaz Bin Abdul Haq, 38 Syed Altafuddin Ahmed, 87 Mohammad Fareed]

26 September 2006: Manipur 0-0 Chhattisgarh

=== Cluster VI - Gurgaon ===
Pos	Team	Pld	W	D	L	GF	GA	GD	Pts
1	Karnataka	2	1	1	0	4	0	+4	4
2	Gujarat	2	0	2	0	0	0	0	2
3	Nagaland	2	0	1	1	0	4	−4	1

23 September 2006: Karnataka 0-0 Gujarat 25 September 2006: Gujarat 0-0 Nagaland 27 September 2006: Karnataka 4-0 Nagaland

[35,53,74 Sampath Kumar Kuttimani, 57 D Raju]

=== Cluster VII - Faridabad ===
Pos	Team	Pld	W	D	L	GF	GA	GD	Pts
1	Delhi	3	2	0	1	8	5	+3	6
2	Jammu&Kashmir	3	1	2	0	3	1	+2	5
3	Railways	3	1	1	1	1	3	−2	4
4	Orissa	3	0	1	2	2	5	−3	1

22 September 2006: Delhi 1-3 Jammu&Kashmir

[D: 41 Trilok Singh Bisht; J: 9,44,90 Ishfaq Ahmed]

23 September 2006: Orissa 0-1 Railways

[13 PV Vinoy]

24 September 2006: Delhi 4-2 Orissa

[D: 18,52,76 Sunil Chetri, 69 Praveen Rawat; O: 44 Antu Murmu, 65 Manesh Mohanty]

24 September 2006: Jammu&Kashmir 0-0 Railways 26 September 2006: Orissa 0-0 Jammu&Kashmir 26 September 2006: Delhi 3-0 Railways

[57,60,78 Sunil Chetri]

=== Cluster VIII - Faridabad ===
Pos	Team	Pld	W	D	L	GF	GA	GD	Pts
1	Tamil Nadu	3	3	0	0	7	1	+6	9
2	Jharkhand	3	1	1	1	7	4	+3	4
3	Tripura	3	1	0	2	3	10	−7	3
4	Uttarakhand	3	0	1	2	2	4	−2	1

23 September 2006: Tamil Nadu 4-0 Tripura

[22 J Auxiano, 47,67 Raman Vijayan, 63 Kalia Kulothungan]

23 September 2006: Jharkhand 1-1 Uttarakhand

[J: 23 Budh Ram Soren; U: 61 Rakesh Shah]

25 September 2006: Tamil Nadu 1-0 Uttarakhand

[56 Raman Vijayan]

25 September 2006: Jharkhand 5-1 Tripura

[J: 5 CM Soren, 18,88 Lal Mohan Hansda, 37 Sakla Mardi, 51 Dharmendra Deogam; T: 60 Utpal Chowdhary]

27 September 2006: Tripura 2-1 Uttarakhand

[T: 65,76 Kiran Chettri; U: 83 Rakesh Shah]

27 September 2006: Tamil Nadu 2-1 Jharkhand

[T: 27 Kalia Kulothungan, 72 A Gestaf Antony; J: 90+2 Lal Mohan Hansda]

== Pre-quarterfinal playoffs ==
21 September 2006: Haryana 1-0 Meghalaya

[88 Pradeep Kumar]

21 September 2006: West Bengal 1-0 Services [extra time]

[120 Vimal Pariyar]

29 September 2006: Chhattisgarh 3-5 Karnataka [penalties] 29 September 2006: Delhi 0-1 Tamil Nadu [extra time]

== Quarterfinal League ==
=== Group A ===
Pos	Team	Pld	W	D	L	GF	GA	GD	Pts
1	West Bengal	3	2	0	1	2	2	0	6
2	Punjab	3	1	1	1	2	1	+1	4
3	Goa	3	1	1	1	4	4	0	4
4	Haryana	3	0	2	1	2	3	−1	2

14 October 2006
16:45 IST

Haryana	0–1	West Bengal
	Report Archived 2025-01-23 at the Wayback Machine(subscription required)	Biswas 2'

Devi Lal Sports Complex, Gurgaon
Referee: A. Arjunan (Services)

14 October 2006
19:00 IST

Goa	0–2	Punjab
	Report	Su. Singh 43'; Ma. Singh 79'

Devi Lal Sports Complex, Gurgaon
Referee: Dinesh Nair (Gujarat)

16 October 2006
16:45 IST

Punjab	0–0	Haryana
	Report Archived 2025-01-23 at the Wayback Machine(subscription required)

Devi Lal Sports Complex, Gurgaon
Referee: Navin J. Sundi (Jharkhand)

16 October 2006
19:00 IST

Goa	2–0	West Bengal
Carvalho 31'; Mascarenhas 90+1'	[ Report]

Devi Lal Sports Complex, Gurgaon
Referee: Rizwan-ul Haq (Delhi)

18 October 2006
16:45 IST

Goa	2–2	Haryana
Mascarenhas 67'; Borges 90'	Report Archived 2020-12-30 at the Wayback Machine(subscription required)	Malik 65'; Yadav 75'

Devi Lal Sports Complex, Gurgaon
Referee: M. K. Roy (Assam)

18 October 2006
19:00 IST

Punjab	0–1	West Bengal
	Report	Biswas 57'

Devi Lal Sports Complex, Gurgaon
Referee: Dhanraj More (Maharashtra)

=== Group B ===
Pos	Team	Pld	W	D	L	GF	GA	GD	Pts
1	Maharashtra	3	2	1	0	5	1	+4	7
2	Kerala	3	2	1	0	6	3	+3	7
3	Tamil Nadu	3	1	0	2	3	4	−1	3
4	Karnataka	3	0	0	3	1	7	−6	0

15 October 2006: Kerala 3-1 Tamil Nadu

[K: 13 km Abdul Naushad, 50,78 NP Pradeep; T: 25 Kalia Kulothungan]

15 October 2006: Maharashtra 3-0 Karnataka

[47 Adil Ansari, 64 Abhishek Yadav, 83 Paresh Shivalkar]

17 October 2006: Tamil Nadu 2-0 Karnataka

[66 S Satish Kumar, 68 Jotin Singh]

17 October 2006: Maharashtra 1-1 Kerala

[M: 8 Kasif Jamal; K: 29 km Abdul Naushad]

19 October 2006: Kerala 2-1 Karnataka

[Ke: 16 KS Joby, 85 NP Pradeep; Ka: 35 Jean Christian (own Goal)]

19 October 2006: Maharashtra 1-0 Tamil Nadu

[66 Adil Ansari]

== Semi-finals ==
Punjab made the final of the competition by virtue of a 2–1 win over Maharashtra to regain the trophy for the first time in 20 years.

22 October 2006
16:00 IST

Maharashtra	1–2	Punjab
Yadav 43'	Report(subscription required)	B. Singh 60'; Parveen Kumar 67'

Devi Lal Sports Complex, Gurgaon
Referee: Dinesh Nair (Gujarat)

22 October 2006
19:00 IST

West Bengal	0–0 (a.e.t.)	Kerala
	Report
Penalties
Biswas (penalty scored); Maria (penalty scored); Dutta (penalty scored); Mondal (penalty scored)	4–2	(penalty missed) R. Rajesh; (penalty missed) Karnath; (penalty scored) Thomas; (penalty scored) Pradeep

Devi Lal Sports Complex, Gurgaon
Referee: Rizwan-ul Haq (Delhi)

== Final ==
25 October 2006
17:00 IST

Punjab	0–0 (a.e.t.)	West Bengal
	Report Archived 2025-01-23 at the Wayback Machine(subscription required)
Penalties
Praveen Kumar (penalty scored); Jaspal Singh (penalty scored); Narinder Singh (penalty scored); D. Singh (penalty scored); Harp. Singh (penalty scored)	5–3	(penalty scored) Biswas; (penalty scored) Maria; (penalty scored) Mondal; (penalty missed) Dutta

Devi Lal Sports Complex, Gurgaon
Referee: Dinesh Nair (Gujarat)
