= 2006–07 National Football League (India) =

11th season of National Football League

National Football League
- Season: 2006–07
- Dates: 5 January – 19 May 2007
- Champions: Dempo; 2nd NFL title 2nd Indian title
- Runner up: JCT
- Relegated: Mohammedan Sporting; Hindustan Aeronautics Limited
- AFC Cup: Dempo; East Bengal
- Top goalscorer: Odafa Onyeka Okolie (18 goals)
- Biggest home win: Mahindra United 9–0 Mohammedan Sporting (18 May 2007)
- Biggest away win: Mohammedan Sporting 1–4 Churchill Brothers (2 May 2007)
- Highest scoring: Mahindra United 9–0 Mohammedan Sporting (18 May 2007)
- Highest attendance: 50,000
- Lowest attendance: 200
- Total attendance: 3,58,050
- Average attendance: 3,978

The 2006–07 National Football League was the 11th and final season of the top Indian professional league for association football clubs before it is rebranded as the I-League from 2007–08 season. This change was part of a broader effort to professionalize the league.

== Overview ==
The league was contested by 10 teams, Churchill Brothers FC and Hindustan Aeronautical LTD were promoted from NFL - 2. Dempo winning the championship under the guidance of coach Armando Colaco. This victory marked their second title in the league. JCT secured the second position, while Mahindra came third. Mohammedan and HAL (Hindustan Aeronotics Limited) were relegated from the league for the next edition of National Football League 2007-08.

== League standings ==
Locations of teams in the 2006–07 National Football League

| Pos | Team | Pld | W | D | L | GF | GA | GD | Pts | Qualification |
|---|---|---|---|---|---|---|---|---|---|---|
| 1 | Dempo | 18 | 11 | 3 | 4 | 37 | 21 | +16 | 36 | Champions |
| 2 | JCT Mills | 18 | 9 | 4 | 5 | 31 | 19 | +12 | 31 | |
| 3 | Mahindra United | 18 | 8 | 6 | 4 | 29 | 14 | +15 | 30 | |
| 4 | Churchill Brothers | 18 | 7 | 8 | 3 | 30 | 23 | +7 | 29 | |
| 5 | East Bengal | 18 | 7 | 5 | 6 | 29 | 29 | 0 | 26 | |
| 6 | Sporting Clube de Goa | 18 | 6 | 7 | 5 | 23 | 19 | +4 | 25 | |
| 7 | Air India | 18 | 4 | 9 | 5 | 20 | 23 | −3 | 21 | |
| 8 | Mohun Bagan | 18 | 5 | 6 | 7 | 15 | 21 | −6 | 21 | |
| 9 | Mohammedan Sporting | 18 | 2 | 6 | 10 | 17 | 42 | −25 | 12 | Relegated |
| 10 | Hindustan Aeronautics Limited | 18 | 2 | 4 | 12 | 12 | 32 | −20 | 10 | Relegated |

Source: rsssf.com

== Season statistics ==
=== Top scorers ===
| Rank | Player | Club | Goals |
|---|---|---|---|
| 1 | (Nigeria) Odafa Onyeka Okolie | Churchill Brothers | 18 |
| 2 | (Nigeria) Ranti Martins | Dempo | 16 |
| 3 | (Brazil) Edmilson Marques Pardal | East Bengal | 13 |
| 3 | (Nigeria) Dudu Omagbemi | Sporting Clube | 13 |
| 5 | (Nigeria) Chidi Edeh | JCT Mills | 12 |
| 5 | (India) Sunil Chhetri | JCT Mills | 12 |
| 7 | (Ghana) Andrews Pomeyie Mensah | Mahindra United | 11 |
| 8 | (Kenya) Boniface Ambani | East Bengal | 7 |
| 9 | (India) Anthony Pereira | Dempo | 6 |
| 9 | (India) Samson Singh | Air India | 6 |

=== Hat-tricks ===
| Player | For | Against | Result | Date | Ref. |
|---|---|---|---|---|---|
| Mohammed Rafi | Mahindra United | Mohammedan Sporting | 9–0 (H) | 19 May 2007 | |

Note: (H) – Home; (A) – Away

== Season awards ==
| Award | Recipient | Club |
|---|---|---|
| Best Player | Sunil Chhetri | JCT FC |
| Best Midfielder | Roberto Mendes Silva | Dempo |
| Best Goalkeeper | Sandip Nandy | Mahindra United |
| Best Defender | Mahesh Gawli | Mahindra United |
| Fair Play | JCT Mills | |
