= 2007 Indian Federation Cup final =

- Event: 2007 Indian Federation Cup
East Bengal	Mahindra United
2	1
- Date: 15 September 2007
- Venue: Guru Nanak Stadium, Ludhiana, Punjab
- Man of the Match: Edmilson Marques Pardal
- Referee: K Shankar (Tamil Nadu)

The 2007 Indian Federation Cup final was the 29th final of the Indian Federation Cup, the top knock-out competition in India and was contested between Kolkata giants East Bengal and Mahindra United on the 15th of September 2007.

East Bengal won the final 2–1 with a brace from Brazilian forward Edmilson Marques Pardal to claim their fifth Federation Cup title.

== Route to the final ==
=== East Bengal ===
Round	Date	Opposition	Score
R16	4 September 2007	Mohammedan Sporting	3–1
Quarter Final	9 September 2007	JCT	3–2
Semi Final	11 September 2007	Mohun Bagan	3–2

East Bengal entered the 2007 Indian Federation Cup automatically as they were already in the I-League. In the R16, East Bengal faced Mohammedan Sporting in their opening match and won 3–1 with Ashim Biswas putting them ahead in the 21st minute. In the quarter-final, East Bengal faced hosts JCT and won 3–2 with another brace from Edmilson after Irungbam Surkumar Singh put them ahead in the 14th minute. Eduardo da Silva Escobar and Renedy Singh scored for JCT. In the semi-final, it was a Kolkata Derby as East Bengal faced rivals Mohun Bagan. Bhaichung Bhutia put Mohun Bagan ahead in the 12th minute but East Bengal proceeded to score three goals and qualify into the final. Surkumar Singh equalised in the 25th minute while Dipendu Biswas and Ashim Biswas scored the other two. José Ramirez Barreto's goal in the 71st minute was not enough for Bagan as East Bengal won 3–2 to reach the final.

=== Mahindra United ===
Round	Date	Opposition	Score
R16	5 September 2007	HAL	1–0
Quarter Final	8 September 2007	Sporting Clube de Goa	1–1 (5-4 pen)
Semi Final	12 September 2007	Dempo	1–1 (3-1 pen)

Mahindra United entered the 2007 Indian FedI-Leagueeration Cup automatically as they were already in the I-League. In the pre-quarter finals, they faced HAL and won it courtesy of a solitary goal from Steven Dias in the 9th minute. In the Quarter Final, they faced Sporting Clube de Goa; after 120 minutes the game ended 1–1 and Mahindra won 5–4 via penalty shootout to reach the last four of the tournament. In the semi-final, Mahindra United faced the reigning I-League champions Dempo and the match once again remained deadlocked at 1–1 after 120 minutes. Manjit Singh put Mahindra ahead in the 32nd minute but Beto equalised for Dempo just six minutes later. Mahindra won the game 3–1 in the penalty shootout to reach the final.

== Match ==
=== Details ===
15 September 2007
18:30 IST

East Bengal	2–1	Mahindra United
Edmilson Marques Pardal 36' (pen.), 45+1'	Report	Sunil Kumar (red card) 42'; Manjit Singh 45+3'

Guru Nanak Stadium, Ludhiana
Attendance: 10,000 (est.)
Referee: K Shankar (Tamil Nadu)

East Bengal	Mahindra

GK	24	(India) Subrata Paul (c)
LB	29	(India) Saumik Dey
CB	3	(Nigeria) Majek Bolaji
CB	2	(India) Muttah Suresh
RB	27	(India) Irungbam Surkumar Singh
CM	26	(India) Mehrajuddin Wadoo	(substituted off) 82'
CM	7	(India) Jayanta Sen
RW	9	(India) Alvito D'Cunha	(substituted off) 74'
LW	19	(India) Syed Rahim Nabi
ST	25	(India) Ashim Biswas
ST	30	(Brazil) Edmilson Marques Pardal	(substituted off) 90'
Substitutes:
DF	17	(Ghana) Abdul Samed Okocha	(substituted on) 82'
MF	6	(India) Dipankar Roy	(substituted on) 74'
FW	10	(India) Dipendu Biswas	(substituted on) 90'
Manager:
(India) Subrata Bhattacharya

GK	24	(India) Sandip Nandy (c)
RB	7	(India) Sushanth Mathew
CB	16	(India) Sunil Kumar
CB	5	(India) Harpreet Singh
LB	14	(India) Dharmaraj Ravanan
LM	4	(India) Krishnan Nair Ajayan
CM	29	(Ivory Coast) Douhou Pierre
RM	23	(India) Steven Dias	(substituted off) 78'
ST	12	(India) Manjit Singh	(substituted off) 79'
ST	26	(Democratic Republic of the Congo) Edson Minga	(substituted off) 46'
ST	10	(Nigeria) Andrews Pomeyie Mensah
Substitutes:
MF	17	(India) Sukhwinder Singh		(substituted on) 46'
FW	11	(India) Mohammad Rafi		(substituted on) 78'
FW	9	(India) Surojit Bose		(substituted on) 79'
Manager:
(India) Derrick Pereira

Hero of the Match:
Edmilson Marques Pardal (East Bengal)

Match rules

- 90 minutes.
- 30 minutes of extra time if necessary.
- Penalty shoot-out if scores still level.

== See also ==
- 29th "Hero Cycles" Federation Cup 2007
