= Samson Singh =

Samson Singh can refer to:

- Samson Singh (cricketer) (born 1989), Indian cricketer
- Samson Singh (footballer) (born 1984), Indian footballer
