= 2004 AFC Youth Championship =

Kejohanan Remaja AFC 2004

Tournament details
- Host country: Malaysia
- Dates: 25 September – 9 October
- Teams: 16 (from 1 confederation)
- Venues: 5 (in 4 host cities)

Final positions
- Champions: South Korea (11th title)
- Runners-up: China
- Third place: Japan
- Fourth place: Syria

Tournament statistics
- Matches played: 32
- Goals scored: 82 (2.56 per match)
- Top scorer: (South Korea) Park Chu-young (6 goals)
- Best player: (South Korea) Park Chu-young

The 2004 AFC Youth Championship was the 33rd instance of the AFC Youth Championship. It was held from 25 September to 9 October 2004 in Malaysia. The tournament was won by for the eleventh time by South Korea in the final against China PR.

== Venues ==
The matches were played in the following five venues in four cities.

Johor Bahru
Tan Sri Dato' Haji Hassan Yunos Stadium	2004 AFC Youth Championship (Malaysia)	Pasir Gudang Corporation Stadium
Capacity: 30,000	2004 AFC Youth Championship (Malaysia)	Capacity: 15,000
Kuala Lumpur	Petaling Jaya	Ipoh
Kuala Lumpur Stadium	Petaling Jaya Stadium	Perak Stadium
Capacity: 18,000	Capacity: 25,000	Capacity: 42,500

== Qualification ==
- China
- Indonesia
- India (withdrew Turkmenistan)
- Iran
- Iraq
- South Korea
- Japan
- Laos
- Malaysia
- Nepal
- Qatar
- Syria
- Thailand
- Uzbekistan
- Vietnam
- Yemen

== Group stage ==
=== Group A ===
Pos	Team	Pld	W	D	L	GF	GA	GD	Pts	Qualification
1	Japan	3	3	0	0	7	0	+7	9	Quarter-final
2	Malaysia (H)	3	2	0	1	4	3	+1	6	Quarter-final
3	Nepal	3	1	0	2	1	6	−5	3	
4	Vietnam	3	0	0	3	0	3	−3	0	

(H) Hosts
September 25, 2004

Japan	3–0	Nepal
Takuya Kokeguchi 15'; Sota Hirayama 33'; Hiroki Nakayama 59'

Tan Sri Dato' Haji Hassan Yunos Stadium, Johor Bahru
September 25, 2004

Vietnam	0–1	Malaysia
		Krishnan Linggam 62'

Tan Sri Dato' Haji Hassan Yunos Stadium, Johor Bahru

September 27, 2004

Nepal	1–0	Vietnam
Pradeep Mahajan 61' (pen.)

Tan Sri Dato' Haji Hassan Yunos Stadium, Johor Bahru
September 27, 2004

Malaysia	0–3	Japan
		Takuya Kokeguchi 2'; Yojiro Takahagi 42'; Takayuki Morimoto 68'

Tan Sri Dato' Haji Hassan Yunos Stadium, Johor Bahru

September 29, 2004

Japan	1–0	Vietnam
Takayuki Morimoto 66'

Tan Sri Dato' Haji Hassan Yunos Stadium, Johor Bahru
September 29, 2004

Nepal	0–3	Malaysia
		Norshahrul Idlan Talaha 43'; Ahmad Azlan Zainal 68'; Pralay Rajbhandari 90+3' (o.g.)

Pasir Gudang Corporation Stadium, Johor Bahru

=== Group B ===
Pos	Team	Pld	W	D	L	GF	GA	GD	Pts	Qualification
1	China	3	2	1	0	6	1	+5	7	Quarter-final
2	Qatar	3	2	0	1	3	2	+1	6	Quarter-final
3	Iran	3	1	1	1	7	4	+3	4	
4	Indonesia	3	0	0	3	3	12	−9	0	

September 25, 2004

China	0–0	Iran

Kuala Lumpur Stadium, Kuala Lumpur
September 25, 2004

Qatar	1–0	Indonesia
Emad Al-Dahri 10'

Kuala Lumpur Stadium, Kuala Lumpur

September 27, 2004

Iran	1–2	Qatar
Adel Kolahkaj 45+2'		Waleed Abdulla 2' (pen.); Khalid Al-Hajari 54'

Kuala Lumpur Stadium, Kuala Lumpur
September 27, 2004

Indonesia	1–5	China
Boaz Solossa 57'		Hao Junmin 11'; Tan Wangsong 14'; Zhou Haibin 20'; Zhu Ting 39'; Shen Longyuan 90+2'

Kuala Lumpur Stadium, Kuala Lumpur

September 29, 2004

China	1–0	Qatar
Dong Fangzhuo 56'

Kuala Lumpur Stadium, Kuala Lumpur
September 29, 2004

Iran	6–2	Indonesia
Milad Midavoodi 39'; Mehrdad Oladi 43', 57', 61', 71'; Hamed Rasouli 79'		Aditya Prananda 65'; Boaz Solossa 82'

Petaling Jaya Stadium, Petaling Jaya

=== Group C ===
Pos	Team	Pld	W	D	L	GF	GA	GD	Pts	Qualification
1	Uzbekistan	3	2	1	0	8	4	+4	7	Quarter-final
2	Syria	3	2	1	0	7	3	+4	7	Quarter-final
3	Laos	3	1	0	2	4	9	−5	3	
4	India	3	0	0	3	2	5	−3	0	

September 26, 2004

Uzbekistan	5–2	Laos
Nodirbek Kuziboyev 54', 71', 74'; Marat Bikmoev 84'; Sadriddin Abdullayev 89'		Sengaloun Souvanh 57'; Visay Phaphouvanin 82'

Petaling Jaya Stadium, Petaling Jaya
September 26, 2004

Syria	2–1	India
Safir Al-Atasi 55'; Abdul Razak Al-Housain 77'		Vimal Pariyar 30'

Petaling Jaya Stadium, Petaling Jaya

September 28, 2004

Laos	1–4	Syria
Bounmy Insysiangmay 34'		Abdul Fattah Alaga 10'; Abdul Alrazak Al-Housain 32'; Mesalaz Kailouni 35'; Majed Al-Haj 73'

Petaling Jaya Stadium, Petaling Jaya
September 28, 2004

India	1–2	Uzbekistan
Manjit Singh 67'		Aleksandr Kletskov 28'; Sadriddin Abdullayev 90+'

Petaling Jaya Stadium, Petaling Jaya

September 30, 2004

Uzbekistan	1–1	Syria
Daut Djatdoyev 3' (pen.)		Aatef Jenyat 79'

Kuala Lumpur Stadium, Kuala Lumpur
September 30, 2004

Laos	1–0	India
Soulikhan Phanthaya 77'

Petaling Jaya Stadium, Petaling Jaya

=== Group D ===
Pos	Team	Pld	W	D	L	GF	GA	GD	Pts	Qualification
1	Iraq	3	3	0	0	7	0	+7	9	Quarter-final
2	South Korea	3	1	1	1	5	4	+1	4	Quarter-final
3	Thailand	3	1	1	1	3	4	−1	4	
4	Yemen	3	0	0	3	1	8	−7	0	

September 26, 2004

South Korea	0–3	Iraq
		Mubarak 42', 84'; Majeed 90+1'

Perak Stadium, Ipoh
September 26, 2004

Thailand	2–1	Yemen
Teeratep Winothai 3', 39' (pen.)		Abdo Al–Edresi 37'

Perak Stadium, Ipoh

September 28, 2004

Iraq	2–0	Thailand
Zaki 7'; Sabah 32'

Perak Stadium, Ipoh
September 28, 2004

Yemen	0–4	South Korea
		Kim Seung-yong 9'; Kim Jin-kyu 13'; Park Chu-young 37', 79'

Perak Stadium, Ipoh

September 30, 2004

South Korea	1–1	Thailand
Park Chu-young 41'		Kim Tae-won 7' (o.g.)

Perak Stadium, Ipoh
September 30, 2004

Iraq	2–0	Yemen
Kadhim 33'; Yousif 87'

Kuala Lumpur Stadium, Kuala Lumpur

== Knockout stage ==
=== Bracket ===
Quarter-finals
3 October – Johor Bahru
Japan (p)	0 (5)
Qatar	0 (3)
3 October – Kuala Lumpur
Uzbekistan	1
South Korea (a.e.t.)	2
3 October – Kuala Lumpur
China	3
Malaysia	0
3 October – Ipoh
Iraq	0
Syria	1

Semi-finals
6 October – Kuala Lumpur
Japan	2 (1)
South Korea (p)	2 (3)
6 October – Ipoh
China	1
Syria	0

Final
9 October – Kuala Lumpur
South Korea	2
China	0
Third place
9 October – Kuala Lumpur
Japan (p)	1 (4)
Syria	1 (3)

=== Quarterfinals ===
October 3, 2004

Japan	0–0 (a.e.t.)	Qatar
Penalties
	5–3

Tan Sri Dato' Haji Hassan Yunos Stadium, Johor Bahru
October 3, 2004

China	3–0	Malaysia
Chen Tao 46'; Zou You 51'; Zhou Haibin 64'

Kuala Lumpur Stadium, Kuala Lumpur

October 3, 2004

Uzbekistan	1–2 (a.e.t.)	South Korea
Nodirbek Kuziboyev 78'		Kim Seung-yong 39'; Shin Young-rok 105'

Kuala Lumpur Stadium, Kuala Lumpur
October 3, 2004

Iraq	0–1	Syria
		Majed Al–Haj 75'

Perak Stadium, Ipoh

=== Semifinals ===
October 6, 2004

Japan	2–2 (a.e.t.)	South Korea
Kazuma Watanabe 90+2'; Sota Hirayama 120'		Baek Ji-hoon 33'; Park Chu-young 113'
Penalties
	1–3

Kuala Lumpur Stadium, Kuala Lumpur

October 6, 2004

China	1–0	Syria
Zhu Ting 54'

Perak Stadium, Ipoh

=== Third place playoff ===
October 9, 2004

Japan	1–1	Syria
Keisuke Funatani 32'		Tatsuya Masushima 40' (o.g.)
Penalties
	4–3

Kuala Lumpur Stadium, Kuala Lumpur

=== Final ===
October 9, 2004

South Korea	2–0	China
Park Chu-young 37', 44'

Kuala Lumpur Stadium, Kuala Lumpur

== Winners ==
AFC Youth Championship 2004 winners

South Korea
Eleventh title

== Goalscorers ==
There were 82 goals scored in 32 matches, for an average of 2.56 goals per match.

6 goals

- (South Korea) Park Chu-young

4 goals

- (Iran) Mehrdad Oladi
- (Uzbekistan) Nodirbek Kuziboyev

2 goals

- (China) Zhu Ting
- (Indonesia) Boaz Solossa
- (Iraq) Muslim Mubarak
- (Japan) Takuya Kokeguchi
- (Japan) Takayuki Morimoto
- (Japan) Sota Hirayama
- (Syria) Abdul Razak Al-Housain
- (Syria) Majed Al-Haj
- (Thailand) Teeratep Winothai

1 goal

- (China) Hao Junmin
- (China) Tan Wangsong
- (China) Zhou Haibin
- (China) Shen Longyuan
- (China) Dong Fangzhuo
- (China) Chen Tao
- (China) Zou You
- (China) Zhou Haibin
- (Indonesia) Aditya Prananda
- (India) Vimal Pariyar
- (India) Manjit Singh
- (Iran) Adel Kolahkaj
- (Iran) Milad Midavoodi
- (Iran) Hamed Rasouli
- (Iraq) Fareed Majeed
- (Iraq) Wissam Zaki
- (Iraq) Haidar Sabah
- (Iraq) Omer Kadhim
- (Iraq) Ali Yousif
- (Japan) Hiroki Nakayama
- (Japan) Yojiro Takahagi
- (Japan) Kazuma Watanabe
- (Japan) Keisuke Funatani
- (South Korea) Kim Seung-yong
- (South Korea) Kim Jin-kyu
- (South Korea) Kim Seung-yong
- (South Korea) Shin Young-rok
- (South Korea) Baek Ji-hoon
- (Laos) Sengaloun Souvanh
- (Laos) Visay Phaphouvanin
- (Laos) Bounmy Insysiangmay
- (Laos) Soulikhan Phanthaya
- (Malaysia) Krishnan Linggam
- (Malaysia) Norshahrul Idlan Talaha
- (Malaysia) Ahmad Azlan Zainal
- (Nepal) Pradeep Mahajan
- (Qatar) Emad Al-Dahri
- (Qatar) Waleed Abdulla
- (Qatar) Khalid Al-Hajari
- (Syria) Safir Al-Atasi
- (Syria) Aatef Jenyat
- (Syria) Abdul Fattah Alaga
- (Syria) Mesalaz Kailouni
- (Uzbekistan) Marat Bikmoev
- (Uzbekistan) Sadriddin Abdullayev
- (Uzbekistan) Daut Djatdoyev
- (Yemen) Abdo Al–Edresi

1 own goal

- (Japan) Tatsuya Masushima (against Syria)
- (South Korea) Kim Tae-won (against Thailand)
- (Nepal) Janak Singh (against Malaysia)

== Countries to participate in 2005 FIFA World Youth Championship ==
- South Korea
- China
- Japan
- Syria
