= Baldeep Singh =

Baldeep Singh may refer to:

- Baldeep Singh (footballer, born 1982), Indian football defender
- Baldeep Singh (footballer, born 1987), Indian football central midfielder
