= Saptarshi Banerjee =

Indian politician

Member of the West Bengal Legislative Assembly
- In office 2 May 2021 – 4 May 2026
- Preceded by: Dipendu Biswas
- Succeeded by: Surajit Mitra
- Constituency: Basirhat Dakshin

Personal details
- Party: INC; AITC (till 2026 )
- Profession: Doctor

Saptarshi Banerjee, is a doctor and an Indian politician member of All India Trinamool Congress. He is an MLA, elected from the Basirhat Dakshin constituency in the 2021 West Bengal Legislative Assembly election. He gathered 1,15,873 votes in the election.

== Education ==
He passed MBBS from Nil Ratan Sircar Medical College and Hospital in 2005, Calcutta University and M.S. Ophthalmology from Vivekanand Institute of Medical College, WB University of Health Science in 2010. He was associated with medical teaching Medical College Kolkata.
