= Hamed Rasouli =

Iranian footballer

Personal information
- Full name: Hamed Rasouli
- Date of birth: 18 January 1985 (age 41)
- Place of birth: Esfahan, Iran
- Position: Striker

Team information
- Current team: Sepahan Novin F.C.
- Number: 12

Youth career
- –2006: Sepahan

Senior career*
Years	Team	Apps	(Gls)
2006–2008	Sepahan	10	(0)
2008–2009	PAS Hamedan	3	(0)
2009–	Sepahan Novin F.C.		

International career
2004	Iran U20		
- * Club domestic league appearances and goals as of May 2009

Hamed Rasouli (born 18 January 1985) is an Iranian football player. He currently plays for the IPL club PAS Hamedan as a striker.

== Club career ==
A product of the Sepahan's youth system, Rasouli was drafted into the first team for the IPL 2006/07 season.

He played for Sepahan in the 2008 AFC Champions League group stages.

== International career ==
Hamed Rasouli was a member of Iran national under-20 football team at the 2004 AFC Youth Championship
