= Basirhat Dakshin Assembly constituency =

Basirhat Dakshin
- Constituency No. 124 for the West Bengal Legislative Assembly
- Interactive Map Outlining Basirhat Dakshin Assembly Constituency

Constituency details
- Country: India
- Region: East India
- State: West Bengal
- District: North 24 Parganas
- Lok Sabha constituency: Basirhat
- Established: 1951
- Total electors: 212,872
- Reservation: None

Member of Legislative Assembly
- 18th West Bengal Legislative Assembly
- Incumbent Surajit Mitra
- Party: Democratic Trinamool Congress
- Elected year: 2026

Party-wise wins in Basirhat Dakshin Assembly constituency
1. Trinamool Congress (3) (60.0%)
2. Communist Party of India (Marxist) (1) (20.0%)
3. Bharatiya Janata Party (1) (20.0%)

Basirhat Dakshin Assembly constituency is an assembly constituency in North 24 Parganas district in the Indian state of West Bengal. It is the only urbanizated assembly constituency of Basirhat Lok Sabha constituency with 55 percent of urban voters because of the presence of Basirhat Greater Municipal Area.

== Overview ==
As per orders of the Delimitation Commission, 124 Basirhat Dakshin Assembly constituency is composed of the following: Basirhat municipality, Basirhat I community development block, and Taki municipality.

Basirhat Dakshin Assembly constituency is part of 18. Basirhat (Lok Sabha constituency).

== Members of the Legislative Assembly ==
Year	Member	Party
Till 2011 : Constituency did not exist
2011	Narayan Mukherjee	Communist Party of India (Marxist)
2014^	Samik Bhattacharya	Bharatiya Janata Party
2016	Dipendu Biswas	Trinamool Congress
2021	Saptarshi Banerjee	Trinamool Congress
2026	Surajit Mitra	Trinamool Congress

- ^ denotes by-election

^ By-election

== Election results ==
=== 2026 ===
2026 West Bengal Legislative Assembly election: Basirhat Dakshin
Party	Candidate	Votes	%	±%
AITC	Surajit Mitra	112,965	45.09	−4.06
BJP	Dr. Sourya Banerjee	103,421	41.28	+2.51
CPI(M)	Aynul Arefin	23,710	9.46	
INC	Abu Esahak Gazi	3,505	1.4	−8.39
NOTA	None of the above	1,327	0.53	−0.19
Majority		9,544	3.81	−6.57
Turnout		250,535	96.09	+10.66
AITC hold		Swing	-4.06	

=== 2021 ===
2021 West Bengal Legislative Assembly election: Basirhat Dakshin
Party	Candidate	Votes	%	±%
AITC	Saptarshi Banerjee	115,873	49.15	▲8.5
BJP	Tarak Nath Ghosh	91,405	38.77	▲9.22
INC	Amit Majumdar	23,089	9.79	▼16.53
NOTA	None of the above	1,689	0.72	
Majority		24,468	10.38	
Turnout		235,737	85.43	
AITC hold		Swing		

=== 2016 ===
2016 West Bengal Legislative Assembly election: Basirhat Dakshin
Party	Candidate	Votes	%	±%
AITC	Dipendu Biswas	88,085	40.65	+11.37
BJP	Samik Bhattacharya	64,027	29.55	+25.64
INC	Asit Majumdar	57,035	26.32	−37.81
NOTA	None of the above	1,949	0.89	
CPI(ML)L	Debabrata Biswas	1,462	0.67	N/A
BSP	Dilip Bairagi	1,133	0.52	−1.40
SUCI(C)	Ajay Kumar Bain	1,081	0.49	
PDS	Barun Das	964	0.44	
RPI(A)	Tasirul Mondal	903	0.41	
Majority		24,058	11.10	
Turnout		2,16,639		
AITC gain from BJP		Swing		

=== 2014 bypoll ===
A bye-election was held on 13 September 2014 following the death of the sitting MLA, Narayan Mukherjee.

West Bengal state assembly bye-election, 2014: Basirhat Dakshin constituency
Party	Candidate	Votes	%	±%
BJP	Samik Bhattacharya	71,002	37.43	+33.52
AITC	Dipendu Biswas	69,416	36.59	+7.31
CPI(M)	Mrinal Chakraborty	24,884	13.12	−22.86
INC	Asit Majumdar	21,958	11.58	N/A
SUCI(C)	Ajay Kumar Bain	2,431	1.28	N/A
Majority		1,586	0.84	−5.82
Turnout		1,89,694	80.43	−6.8
BJP gain from CPI(M)		Swing	+22.09	

=== 2011 ===
In the 2011 election, Narayan Mukherjee of CPI(M) defeated his nearest rival Narayan Goswami of Trinamool Congress.

West Bengal assembly elections, 2011: Basirhat Dakshin constituency
Party	Candidate	Votes	%	±%
CPI(M)	Narayan Mukherjee	66,924	35.94	
AITC	Narayan Goswami	54,514	29.28	
Independent	Asit Majumdar	52,484	28.19	
BJP	Hajarilal Sarkar	7,282	3.91	
BSP	Amitosh Kumar Mondal	3,572	1.92	
IUML	Hafijul Mistri	1,391	0.75	
Majority		12,410	6.66	
Turnout		186,157	87.22	
CPI(M) win (new seat)				

As per 2011 census total population of Basirhat Dakshin is 335130, Hindu 183256, Muslim 151180, Other 694.Hindu 54.682%, Muslim 45.111%, Other 0.207%.

=== 2006 ===
During the period Narayan Mukherjee of CPI(M) won seven elections in a row from 95 Basirhat assembly constituency, defeating his nearest rivals Asit Majumdar of INC in 2006, Souren Sen of Trinamool Congress in 2001, Asit Majumdar of Congress in 1996, Dilip Mazumdar of Congress in 1991 and 1987, and Debi Prasad Nanda of Congress in 1982 and 1977.

=== 1972 ===
Contests in most years were multi cornered but only winners and runners are being mentioned. Lalit Kumar Ghosh of Congress won in 1972 and 1971. A.B.Bandopadhyay of CPI won in 1969 and 1967. Bijesh Chandra Sen of Congress won in 1962. Profulla Nath Banerjee of Congress won in 1957 and in independent India's first election in 1951.
