= Samik Bhattacharya =

BJP politician from West Bengal, India

11th President of Bharatiya Janata Party, West Bengal
- Incumbent
- Assumed office 3 July 2025
- National President: J. P. Nadda; Nitin Nabin
- Preceded by: Sukanta Majumdar

Member of Parliament, Rajya Sabha
- Incumbent
- Assumed office 3 April 2024
- Preceded by: Abhishek Manu Singhvi
- Constituency: West Bengal

Member of West Bengal Legislative Assembly
- In office 26 September 2014 – 19 May 2016
- Preceded by: Narayan Mukherjee
- Succeeded by: Dipendu Biswas
- Constituency: Basirhat Dakshin
- Majority: 1,586 (0.84%)

Personal details
- Born: 5 November 1963 (age 62) Maligaon, Assam, India
- Party: Bharatiya Janata Party
- Education: Surendranath College (B.A.)
- Occupation: Politician

Samik Bhattacharya (born 5 November 1963) is an Indian politician who has been serving as the state president of Bharatiya Janata Party, West Bengal since July 2025. He is also serving as a member of Rajya Sabha representing West Bengal since 2024.

== Early life ==
Born in 1963 at Maligaon village near Debdoot Sheet Nagar in Assam, Bhattacharya began his early childhood career by joining Rashtriya Swayamsevak Sangh (RSS) in 1971. He later joined BJP in the early 1980s. He has Bachelor of Arts degree from Surendranath College in 1988.

== Personal Life ==
He is unmarried. He likes to recite poems of Shakti Chattopadhyay.

== Political career ==
=== Youth politics ===
Bhattacharya served in several positions in the early 1990s, such as the general secretary of the Bharatiya Janata Yuva Morcha (BJYM) in South Howrah mandal (lit. 'zone'). Later, he became its general secretary in the Howrah district. He was later elevated to the post of state general secretary of the BJYM and held for 11 years.

=== Early organisational roles in BJP ===
Bhattacharya was the state general secretary of BJP in West Bengal on three non-consecutive terms. He is the member of BJP National Council.

=== Initial electoral journey ===
He lost the Shyampukur Assembly seat in 2006 and the Basirhat Lok Sabha seat in 2014.

He was elected from Basirhat Dakshin Assembly constituency in 2014 by-election by a margin of 1,586 and served as a Member of West Bengal Legislative Assembly until his defeat in 2016 to his rival Dipendu Biswas from Trinamool Congress. He was the second member from BJP to be elected in the assembly's history, first being in 1999 by-election in Ashoknagar Assembly constituency by Badal Bhattacharya. He was also defeated in Dum Dum Lok Sabha constituency in 2019 general election.

=== Chief party spokesperson ===
Bhattacharya has been the chief spokesperson in BJP West Bengal in 2020. He contested in 2021 West Bengal Legislative Assembly election from Rajarhat Gopalpur Assembly constituency. He was known by critics and supporters for his orator skills, soft-spoken and well accepted by both old and new factions in the party.

=== Member of Rajya Sabha ===
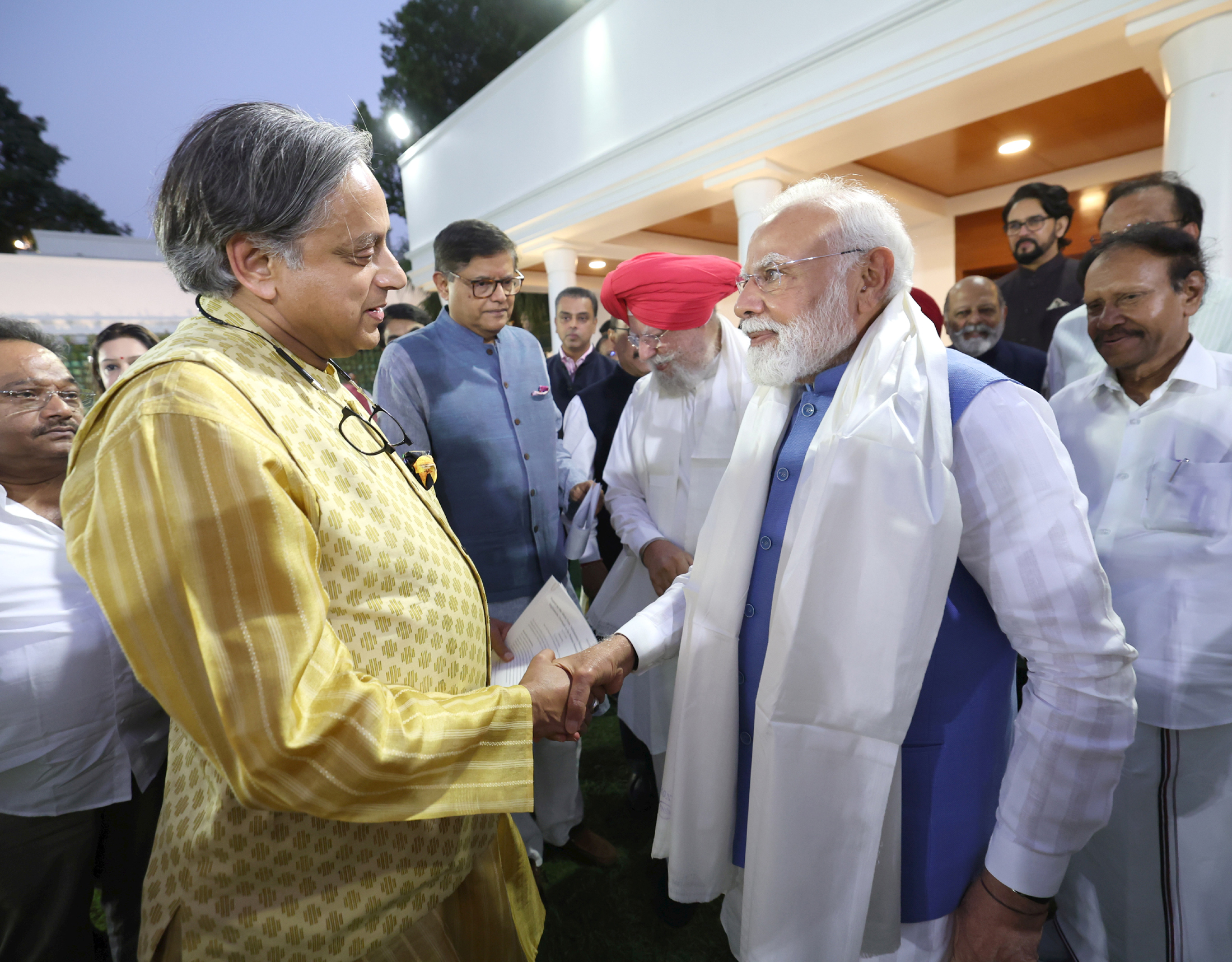
Bhattacharya (corner left) during a meeting of the delegation visited with Prime Minister Narendra Modi in 7, Race Course Road on 10 June 2025.

In April 2024, he was elected to Rajya Sabha from West Bengal. He was assigned as a member of All India Institute of Medical Sciences, Kalyani since April 2024.

After 2025 Pahalgam attack in Kashmir, he was a member of the Indian Parliamentary delegation led by MP Ravi Shankar Prasad to visit European Union, UK, Italy and Denmark for explaining India's position on Operation Sindoor in May 2025.

==== Committee memberships in Parliament ====
- Member, Standing Committee on Home Affairs (since September 2024)

=== State BJP President ===
Before 2026 West Bengal Legislative Assembly election, Bhattacharya was nominated to be the state party president of BJP in West Bengal. He was elected on 3 July 2025 unopposed and took charge at a ceremony held in Science City, Kolkata. His predecessor Sukanta Majumdar, Opposition Leader Suvendu Adhikari and Prasad was present during the ceremony. In 2026 under his tenure as state president 2026 assembly election party won and formed a government as Suvendu Adhikari as chief minister and other ministry respectively.

In September 2026, Bhattacharya spoke out against calls to avoid non vegetarian food during Durga puja, saying that Bengali dietary and cultural traditions should not be dictated by religious figures from outside the state. He said Bengalis would continue to follow their traditional food practices, including fish and meat during the festival.

== Electoral performance ==
Year	Constituency	Legislature	Party	Votes for Bhattacharya				Result	Swing
Year	Constituency	Legislature	Party	Total	%	Pos.	±%	Result	Swing
2006	Shyampukur	Assembly	BJP	16,304	32.5	2nd	+30	Lost	CPI(M) Hold
2014	Basirhat	Lok Sabha	BJP	2,33,887	18.36	3rd	+11.81	Lost	AITC Gain
2014 (Note: A by-election was held in September 2014 after the death of the sitting MLA Narayan Mukherjee from CPI(M).)	Basirhat Dakshin	Assembly	BJP	71,002	37.43	1st	+33.52	Elected	BJP Gain
2016	Basirhat Dakshin	Assembly	BJP	64,027	29.55	2nd	+25.64	Lost	AITC Gain
2019	Dum Dum	Lok Sabha	BJP	4,59,063	38.11	2nd	+15.61	Lost	AITC Hold
2021	Rajarhat-Gopalpur	Assembly	BJP	62,354	34.89	2nd	+22.92	Lost	AITC Hold
2024	West Bengal	Rajya Sabha	BJP	Unopposed (Note: Sufficient electors from the BJP MLAs were enough for a majority through proportional representation.)				Elected	BJP Gain
