= Wakambam Samson Singh =

Indian cricketer (born 1989)

Samson Singh
Personal information
- Full name: Wakambam Samson Singh
- Born: 16 January 1989 (age 37); Imphal, Manipur
- Source: Cricinfo, 6 December 2018

Wakambam Samson Singh (born 16 January 1989) is an Indian cricketer. He made his first-class debut for Manipur in the 2018–19 Ranji Trophy on 6 December 2018.
