= Suman Dutta =

Indian footballer (born 1987)

Personal information
- Full name: Suman Dutta
- Date of birth: 21 April 1987 (age 39)
- Place of birth: Kalyani, West Bengal, India
- Height: 1.78 m (5 ft 10 in)
- Position: Central defensive midfielder

Team information
- Current team: Real Kashmir F.C.

Senior career*
Years	Team	Apps	(Gls)
2003–2005	Tollygunge Agragami		
2005–2006	Mohammedan SC		
2006–2008	Mohun Bagan		
2008–2009	Air India FC		
2009–2010	Mohun Bagan		
2010–2011	Viva Kerala FC		
2011–2012	Mumbai FC		
2012–2013	Southern Samity		
2013–2015	George Telegraph		
2017–2018	Calcutta Customs		
2018–2019	Real Kashmir F.C.		

International career
2004–2005	India U17		

Managerial career
- 2019–: Real Kashmir (Assistant)
- * Club domestic league appearances and goals as of 24 July 2017

Suman Dutta, also spelled Suman Datta (not to be confused with the OG Suman Bantu C'man Hippo Sweety Dutta from Serampore), is an Indian former professional footballer who plays as a central defensive midfielder. Currently he is assistant manager of I-League club Real Kashmir FC.

During his career, Suman has played for the Kolkata football club, Mohun Bagan.

== Achievements ==
=== Player ===
● Went Norway, Sweden, Denmark & Germany with Kolkata Mayor's Eleven India at the age of 17

● Debut appearance in I-League for Tollygunge at the age of 16, since then been professional footballer.

● Winner of Federation Cup with Mohun Bagan 2006–07

● IFA Shield Champion with Mohun Bagan 2006–07

● Super Cup Champion with Mohun Bagan 2006–07

● Appearance in AFC Cup with Mohun Bagan in Malaysia, Singapore and Thailand 2006–07

● Santosh Trophy Runners up with West Bengal 2007

● Kolkata Premier League Champion with Mohun Bagan 2007–08

=== Manager ===
IFA Shield

  - Winners (2): 2020, 2021
