= Sukhwinder Singh (footballer, born 1979) =

Indian footballer

Personal information
- Date of birth: 11 May 1983 (age 43)
- Place of birth: India
- Position: Goalkeeper

Team information
- Current team: Real Kashmir

Senior career*
Years	Team	Apps	(Gls)
2012–2014	Air India	13	(0)
2014	Mohammedan	??	(0)
2017–	Real Kashmir	13	(0)
- * Club domestic league appearances and goals

Sukhwinder Singh (born 11 May 1983) is an Indian footballer who currently plays for Real Kashmir as a goalkeeper.

== Career ==
=== Air India ===
Singh made his debut for Air India F.C. on 20 September 2012 during a Federation Cup match against Mohammedan at the Kanchenjunga Stadium in Siliguri, West Bengal in which he started the match; Air India lost the match 0–1.

=== Mohammedan ===
Singh made his debut for Mohammedan in the I-League on 10 October 2013 against Bengaluru at the Bangalore Football Stadium and played the whole match; Mohammedan lost the match 2–1.

== Career statistics ==
=== Club ===
Statistics accurate as of 27 October 2013

Club	Season	League		Federation Cup		Durand Cup		AFC		Total	
Club	Season	Apps	CS	Apps	CS	Apps	CS	Apps	CS	Apps	CS
Air India	2012–13	15	1	3	1	0	0	—	—	18	2
2013-14	1	0	0	0	0	0	-	-	1	0	
Career total		16	1	3	1	0	0	0	0	19	2

== Honours ==
Real Kashmir

- I-League 2nd Division: 2017–18
