= Sanjeev Maria =

Indian footballer (born 1980)

Personal information
- Full name: Sanjeev Kumar Maria
- Date of birth: 2 September 1980 (age 46)
- Place of birth: Chandigarh, India
- Position: Defender

Senior career*
Years	Team	Apps	(Gls)
2002–2003	AG Haryana Audit		
2003–2004	Mohun Bagan		
2004–2005	Fransa-Pax		
2005–2009	Mohun Bagan		
2009–2010	Salgaocar		
2010–2012	Peerless		

International career
2006	India	5	(0)
- * Club domestic league appearances and goals

Sanjeev Kumar Maria (born 2 September 1980) was a former Indian professional footballer who played as a defender. He played in both the National Football League and I-League for Mohun Bagan, Fransa-Pax, and Salgaocar. He also represented India internationally in 2006 on five occasions.

== Career ==
Born in Chandigarh, Maria started his career with local side AG Haryana Audit before moving to Mohun Bagan in the National Football League. He made a defensive error in an NFL match against Sporting Goa on 28 December 2003 which allowed the match to end 2–2. After the season ended, Maria signed with Fransa-Pax. He stayed with the Goan side for a season before returning to Mohun Bagan and staying with the side for four seasons. While with the Kolkata club, Maria also represented West Bengal in the Santosh Trophy. He was part of the West Bengal side which were defeated in the final of the Santosh Trophy by Punjab on 25 October 2006.

Before the 2009–10 season, it was announced that Maria had signed with Salgaocar. He stayed with the Goan side for a season before ending his career with Peerless in the Calcutta Football League.

== International ==
Maria represented India internationally five times in 2006.

== Career statistics ==
=== International ===
India national team
Year	Apps	Goals
2006	5	0
Total	5	0
