= Surajit Mitra =

Indian politician (born 1974)

Surajit Mitra (Badal) (born 1974) is an Indian politician from West Bengal. He is a member of the West Bengal Legislative Assembly from the Basirhat Dakshin Assembly constituency in North 24 Parganas district representing the Democratic Trinamool Congress.

== Early life and education ==
Mitra is from Basirhat, North 24 Parganas district, West Bengal. He is the son of Samiran Mitra. He completed his Bachelor of Arts in 1999 at Basirhat College which is affiliated with University of Calcutta. He works as an accountant at Basirhat College and also runs his own business. His wife is a cultural artiste. He declared assets worth Rs.1.8 crore in his affidavit to the Election Commission of India.

== Career ==
Mitra won the Basirhat Dakshin Assembly constituency representing the All India Trinamool Congress in the 2026 West Bengal Legislative Assembly election. He polled 1,12,965 votes and defeated his nearest rival, Sourya Banerjee of the Bharatiya Janata Party, by a margin of 9,544 votes.
