= Boniface Ambani =

Kenyan footballer (born 1982)

Personal information
- Full name: Boniface Ngairah Ambani
- Date of birth: 4 November 1982 (age 43)
- Place of birth: Naivasha, Kenya
- Position: Forward

Youth career
- 2001–2002: Oserian Fastac

Senior career*
Years	Team	Apps	(Gls)
2004–2006	Tusker	26	(27)
2006–2007	East Bengal Club	15	(6)
2007–2008	Sporting Club de Goa	13	(4)
2009–2010	Young Africans	24	(16)

International career
1998–2009	Kenya	12	(5)
- * Club domestic league appearances and goals

Boniface Ngairah Ambani (born 4 November 1982) is a Kenyan former professional footballer who played as a forward. He scored 5 goals in 12 appearances for the Kenya national team.

== Career ==
Ambani was born in Naivasha.

The top-scorer of the Kenyan Premier League in 2006 with 20 goals for Tusker, Ambani signed for Indian club East Bengal Club in early 2006.

He spent his last season with Tanzanian club Young Africans, where he scored 18 goals in 22 matches. After an Achilles tendon injury, he retired in spring 2010.
