= Vimal Pariyar =

Indian footballer (born 1986)

Personal information
- Full name: Vimal Pariyar
- Date of birth: 7 March 1986 (age 40)
- Place of birth: Darjeeling, West Bengal, India
- Position: Forward

Youth career
- Tata FA

Senior career*
Years	Team	Apps	(Gls)
2003–2006	Tata FA		
2006–2008	East Bengal		
2008–2009	Mohammedan		
2009–2011	Churchill Brothers		

International career
2004	India U20		
2005	India	2	(0)
- * Club domestic league appearances and goals

Vimal Pariyar (born 7 March 1986) is a former Indian professional footballer who played as a forward. During his career, he was trained at the Tata Football Academy before becoming professional at East Bengal. He also played for Mohammedan and Churchill Brothers. Pariyar also represented India internationally, earning 2 caps in 2005.

== Club career ==
Born in Darjeeling, West Bengal, Pariyar began his career at the Tata Football Academy in Jharkhand. While playing for Tata, Pariyar also represented both Jharkhand and West Bengal in the Santosh Trophy. During the 2006–07 tournament, Pariyar scored 4 goals in West Bengal's opening match against Rajasthan on 14 September and then 3 goals against Madhya Pradesh on 18 September. He would end the tournament with 8 goals total as West Bengal finished as tournament runners-up. While with Tata FA, Pariyar also represented the club in the National Football League 2nd Division.

After graduating from the Tata Football Academy, Pariyar signed with National Football League side East Bengal. He stayed at the club for two seasons before joining local Kolkata rivals Mohammedan. He scored his only goal for the club in I-League on 14 November 2008 against Vasco. He scored the game's only goal in the 86th minute to give Mohammedan a 1–0 victory. Pariyar stayed with Mohammedan for one season before signing with Churchill Brothers. Pariyar's only goal with Churchill Brothers came on 11 March 2010 against Viva Kerala. He scored a 90th-minute equalizer to end the match 1–1.

On 13 September 2011, it was revealed that Pariyar had left Churchill Brothers prior to the 2011–12 season.

== International career ==
While at the Tata Football Academy, Pariyar was selected to the India under-20 side which participated in the 2004 South Asian Games. He started 3 matches as India managed to reach the final. Pariyar was then given his senior international debut for India on 12 August 2005 against Fiji. He started and played the whole match as India were defeated 1–0. He then earned his second cap two days later again against Fiji. The time he started but was substituted off as India lost 2–1.

In March 2006 it was announced that Pariyar had been selected to the under-20 side for the 2006 AFC Challenge Cup. Pariyar scored a brace for India in their first match against Afghanistan as India won 2–0. He then scored another goal in India's next match against the Philippines as the match ended 1–1. India were soon knocked out in the quarter-finals by Nepal.

== International statistics ==
As of match played 14 August 2005

India national team
Year	Apps	Goals
2005	2	0
Total	2	0

== Honours ==
India U20

- South Asian Games Silver medal: 2004
