= Fredy Mascarenhas =

Indian footballer

Personal information
- Date of birth: 11 April 1981 (age 45)
- Place of birth: Cuncolim, Goa, India
- Position: Striker

Team information
- Current team: X-Roads Warriors
- Number: 43

Youth career
- Cuncolim Union
- Raitura
- Salgaocar

Senior career*
| Years | Team | Apps | (Gls) |
| 2000–2002 | St. Anthony's Colva | | |
| 2003–2005 | Salgaocar | | |
| 2005–2006 | Churchill Brothers | | |
| 2006–2007 | East Bengal | | |
| 2007–2009 | Sporting Goa | | |
| 2012–2015 | Robin Hood | 1 | (0) |
| 2015–present | X-Roads Warriors | 13 | (1) |

International career
| 2006 | India | 2 | (0) |
- * Club domestic league appearances and goals

Fredy Mascarenhas (born 11 April 1981) is an Indian professional footballer who plays as a striker, for X-Roads Warriors in the Bermudian Premier Division.

== Youth and early career ==
Fredy Mascarenhas was born on 11 April 1981 in Cuncolim, Goa, India. He started his liking of the game football at a young age after seeing his neighbour and good friend Siano Fernandes who played for Dempo. At the age of 13, he joined his local school football team at Our Lady of Health High School in which he also played in the Subroto Mukerjee Cup. At the same time, Mascarenhas played for his village team in the Goan inter-village tournaments at the under-14 and u-16 levels. Seeing his attitude and skill, his coach, Levino Dias, urged him to give football a serious thought as a career.

He then signed up to join the Salgaocar SC under-19 side and at the same time played for lower division Goan clubs like Cuncolim Union and Raitura SC. While at Salgaocar, he was trained under former u-19 coach Derrick Pereira, who is currently the head coach of Pune FC.

After two seasons, Fredy joined first division Goan club St. Anthony's SC Colva, helping them get promoted to the Goa Professional League. While at Salgaocar, Mascarenhas suffered an accident which kept him out of football for a year. He made a comeback the following season and scored in the first match with the first touch against Churchill brothers. He represented Goa for the Santosh trophy where he was the highest scorer and also became the first player from Goa to score a double hat-trick in a single match against Tripura.

He retired from football in July 2009 after winning the Santosh Trophy with Goa for the second time, thus leaving Indian football on a high note. He had missed some opportunities to represent Goa in junior age-level tournaments for personal reasons.

== Career ==
=== Salgaocar ===
After falling to injury while at Colva, Fredy made his return to football by signing for National Football League side Salgaocar where he played for 3 years, after representing their under-19 for 2 years.

=== Churchill Brothers ===
Fredy then joined Churchill Brothers S.C. of the National Football League. While with Churchill Fredy scored many goals and even won the Santosh Trophy while with Churchill.

=== East Bengal ===
Fredy then left Goa to play in Kolkata with East Bengal FC. His time there was short but while at Bengal he won the Indian Super Cup and Federation Cup.

=== Sporting Goa ===
Fredy then made his return to Goa in 2007 by signing for Sporting Clube de Goa. While at Sporting he played in the I-League with the most notable game coming against his former club, Churchill Brothers, on 18 February 2008 with an 80th-minute goal at the Fatorda Stadium ending the game at 1–1 and denying Churchill of the I-League championship for the time being. Fredy retired from football in July 2009 at the age of 28 and moved to Bermuda to take a non-footballing job.

=== Robin Hood ===
It's been a few years but it's a great feeling to be back on the field. I was not fully fit, I hadn't had much training so it was difficult for me. The only real difference between Bermuda football and Indian football is that there's more professionalism over there. Football is bread and butter for India footballers, it's all they concentrate on. Over here the players have to work and can't always train. For me, football was a full-time job in India; I do miss that. However, I think Bermuda are much higher placed in the FIFA World Rankings, so this will be a good thing for me.

— Fredy Mascarenhas, on his days in Bermuda with Robin Hood.

Three years after retiring from football, Fredy made his return by signing for Robin Hood FC of the Bermudian Premier Division. Fredy then made his debut for Robin Hood two days later on 19 March 2012 against PHC Zebras in which he earned huge praise.

=== X-Roads Warriors ===
In 2015, he moved to another Bermudian Premier League side X-Roads Warriors.

== International ==
Fredy was part of the India national football team during their tour to Canada under coach Bob Houghton and was donning Jersey no. 18. He was also part of the Indian team for their World cup 2010 qualifying matches against Saudi Arabia (home and away). He debuted for the national team on 16 August 2006, in a 3–0 loss to Saudi Arabia.

He later attended National camp under Ex-India national team coach Stephen Constantine.

== Honours ==
Salgaocar

- Goa Professional League: 2003, 2004

Goa

- Santosh Trophy: 2008–09

== See also ==
- List of Indian football players in foreign leagues
