= Andrews Pomeyie Mensah =

Ghanaian footballer

Andrew Mensah Pomeyie (born 11 June 1983) is a striker from Ghana. He was previously a regular for one of Ghana's top teams Great Olympics and has last played for Mahindra United.

== Clubs ==
- 2001–2003: Sekondi Hasaacas
- 2004–2005: Great Olympics
- 2006–2008: Mahindra United
