= Samson Singh Kumam =

Indian footballer (born 1984)

Samson Singh
Personal information
- Full name: Samson Singh Kumam
- Date of birth: 2 June 1984 (age 42)
- Place of birth: Moirang, Manipur, India
- Height: 1.73 m (5 ft 8 in)
- Position: Forward

Senior career*
Years	Team	Apps	(Gls)
20??–2012	Air India	35	(12)
- * Club domestic league appearances and goals

Samson Singh Kumam (Meitei: Kumam Samson Singh, born 2 June 1984) is an Indian football player. He played for Salgaocar FC, Air India FC in the I-League in India as a striker.
