= Baldeep Singh (footballer, born 1982) =

Indian footballer

Personal information
- Full name: Baldeep Singh
- Date of birth: 17 August 1982 (age 44)
- Place of birth: Punjab, India
- Height: 1.79 m (5 ft 10 1/2 in)
- Position: Defender

Team information
- Current team: Air India
- Number: 5

Senior career*
Years	Team	Apps	(Gls)
2011	JCT	74	(6)
2011–2012	United Sikkim	0	(0)
2012–	Air India	23	(1)
- * Club domestic league appearances and goals

Baldeep Singh (born 17 August 1982) is an Indian footballer who plays for Air India as a defender in I-League. He is often referred to as "Baldeep Singh Senior" to avoid confusion with another former JCT player Baldeep Singh "Junior".

== Career ==
=== Air India ===
Singh made his debut for Air India F.C. on 20 September 2012 during a Federation Cup match against Mohammedan at the Kanchenjunga Stadium in Siliguri, West Bengal in which he started the match; Air India lost the match 0–1.

== Career statistics ==
=== Club ===
Statistics accurate as of 12 May 2013

Club	Season	League		Federation Cup		Durand Cup		AFC		Total	
Club	Season	Apps	Goals	Apps	Goals	Apps	Goals	Apps	Goals	Apps	Goals
Air India	2012–13	23	1	0	0	0	0	-	-	23	1
Career total		23	1	0	0	0	0	0	0	23	1
