= Dipendu Biswas =

Indian footballer (born 1981)

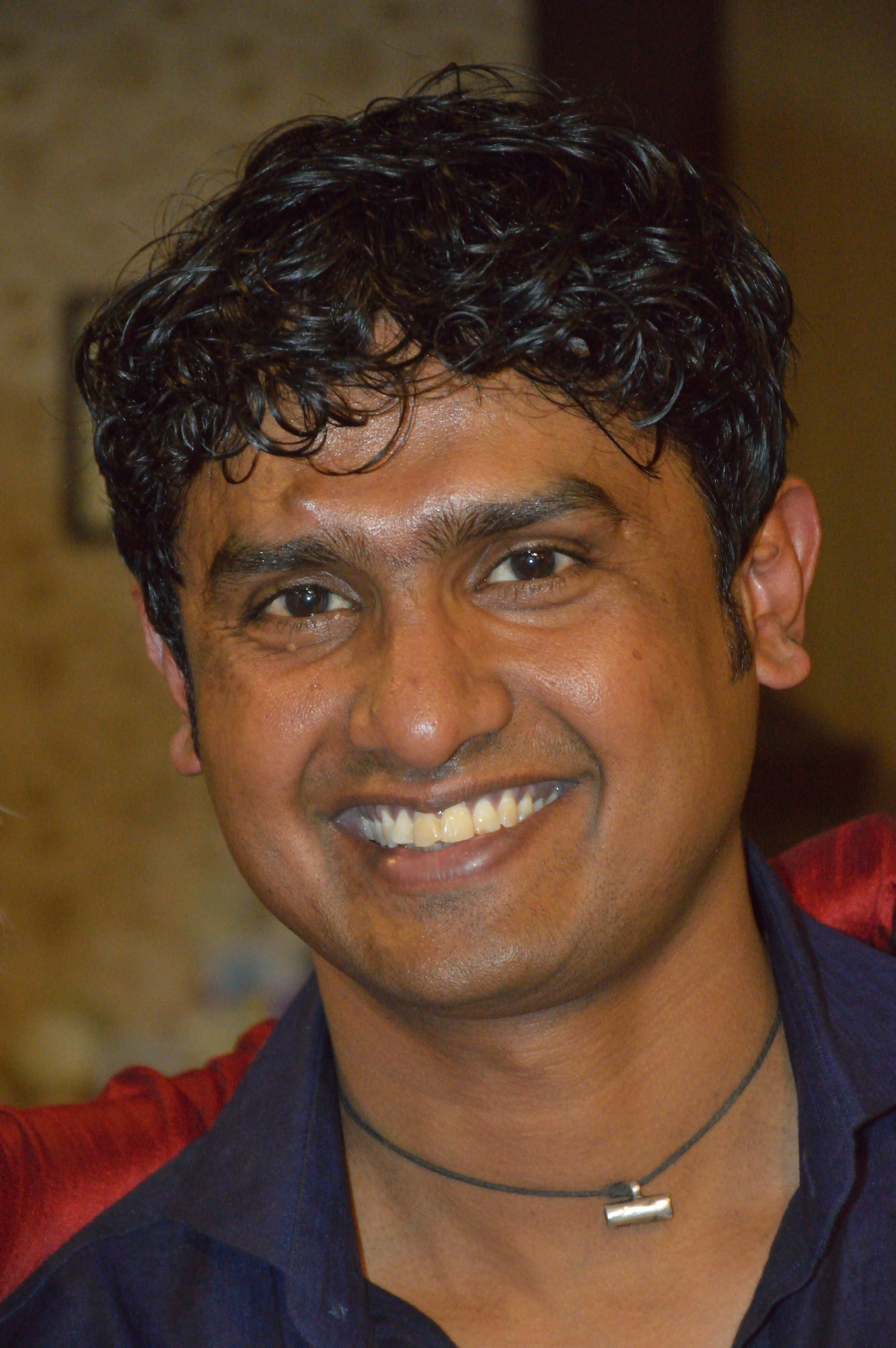
- Biswas in 2015

Personal information
- Date of birth: 29 September 1981 (age 45)
- Place of birth: Basirhat, West Bengal, India

Dipendu Biswas

Member of the West Bengal Legislative Assembly
- In office 2016–2021
- Preceded by: Samik Bhattacharya
- Succeeded by: Saptarshi Banerjee
- Constituency: Basirhat Dakshin

Personal details
- Party: Trinamool Congress (2014–2021, 2026–present)
- Other political affiliations: Bharatiya Janata Party (2021)

Dipendu Biswas (29 September 1981) is an Indian retired professional footballer, and a politician. He resides in Basirhat City..

== Playing career ==
Biswas' father is from West Bengal and mother is from Thalassery in Keralam. He graduated from the Tata Football Academy in 1996. He rejoined Mohun Bagan in 2012.

His earnings in 1998–99 were reported to be ₹1.2 million and in 1999–2000 were ₹0.8 million. In 2011, he was one of a handful of players who were sold land by the government at subsidised prices because they had "made the state proud at national and international levels."

== Political career ==
In 2014, he ran for election from Basirhat in West Bengal under the Trinamool Congress party, and was defeated by Bharatiya Janata Party's candidate Samik Bhattacharya. In the 2016 state assembly elections, he defeated Bhattacharya by more than 20,000 votes. He joined Bharatiya Janata Party (BJP) on 8 March 2021 after not being considered by Trinamool to contest the legislative elections. However, he was not made a candidate even by the BJP, and though he was inducted into the West Bengal State Committee, he left the party within a couple of months.

== Filmography ==
=== Television ===
Year	Show	Role	Note	Ref.
2026	Bigg Boss Bangla 3	Contestant	13th place (Evicted Day 38)	

== Honours ==
East Bengal

- IFA Shield: 2000

Bengal

- Santosh Trophy: 1996–97, 1998–99

== Achievements ==
- Represented Mohun Bagan AC as a forward from 2005 to 2007 and rejoined the club in 2012
- Played for East Bengal FC as a forward between 2007 and 2008
- In July 2020, Biswas became the football secretary of Mohammedan Sporting Club. In the 129-year history of the club, he is the first footballer who has been appointed a football secretary.
