= Manjit Singh (footballer) =

Indian footballer (born 1986)

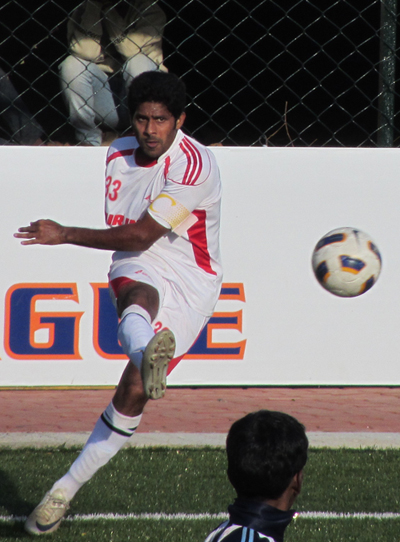
- Singh Air India in 2011

Personal information
- Date of birth: 25 January 1986 (age 40)
- Place of birth: Punjab, India
- Height: 1.78 m (5 ft 10 in)
- Position: Forward

Team information
- Current team: Bharat FC

Senior career*
Years	Team	Apps	(Gls)
2004–2005	JCT		
2005–2006	Mohun Bagan		
2006–2009	Mahindra United		
2009–2010	Salgaocar		
2010–2012	Air India		
2013–2014	Bhawanipore		
2014	Churchill Brothers		
2014–2015	Bharat FC	12	(0)
2016–2017	Mohammedan S.C.		

International career
2006	India U23		
2007–2008	India	12	(0)
- * Club domestic league appearances and goals as of 30 May 2015

Manjit Singh (born 25 January 1986, Punjab) is an Indian football player who plays for Bharat FC in the I-League in India as a striker.

== National career ==
Manjit managed to score 5 goals in 15 games during the 2010-11 I-League season with Air India FC. His accomplishments include:

- Federation Cup runners up with Mahindra United in the year 2007–2008.
- Durand Cup champions with Mahindra United in the year 2008.
- I-League third place runner up with Mahindra United in the year 2006–2007.
- Winning the IFA Shield twice with Mahindra United.
- Santosh Trophy gold medalist with Punjab
- Playing in the I league and other major tournaments with Mohun Bagan team.

== International career ==
Manjit Singh represented his country in international competitions.

- Manjit has represented India in the Asian Games in Doha/Qatar in the year 2006.
- He played in the SAFF Cup in Sri Lanka and the Maldives, finishing as runner-ups.
- He was part of the team which won the 2007 Nehru Cup.
- Singh represented the India national football team in world Cup Football Qualifier Rounds.
- He played in the AFC Cup with India national football team.
- Singh was part of the India National U-18 Team.

== Honours ==
India

- SAFF Championship runner-up: 2008
