= Edmilson (footballer, born 26 June 1980) =

Brazilian footballer

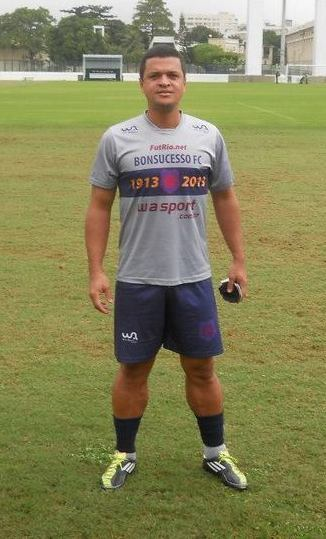

Personal information
- Full name: Edmilson Marques Pardal
- Date of birth: 26 June 1980 (age 46)
- Place of birth: Brazil
- Height: 1.83 m (6 ft 0 in)
- Position: Forward

Senior career*
Years	Team	Apps	(Gls)
2007–2008	East Bengal	62	(44)
2009–2010	Prayag United	20	(16)
2011	Southern Samity	4	(2)
2011–2012	Royal Wahingdoh	10	(12)
2012–2013	East Bengal		(4)
2013–2014	Bonsucesso		
- * Club domestic league appearances and goals

Edmilson Marques Pardal (simply known as Edmilson) is a Brazilian footballer.

== Career ==
=== East Bengal ===
In 2007 Edmilson signed with East Bengal FC in the I-League 2007-08. In his only season with the club he played 27 matches while scoring 23 goals.

=== Prayag United ===
In 2009, Edmilson signed on with another Kolkata-based side Prayag United and played only one season in which he played ten games without scoring.

=== Southern Samity ===
In 2011 Edmilson decided to go to the I-League 2nd Division and signed with Southern Samity for the 2011 season. He played 4 games and scored twice as Southern Samity missed out on promotion.

=== Return to East Bengal ===
On 13 January 2011 it was announced that Edmilson would sign for East Bengal again after he signed with 2nd Division club Royal Wahingoh earlier and represented the club in Federation Cup. He has scored thrice for the club till now. On 25 April 2012 he scored the only goal in the 2012 AFC Cup match at San'a' against Al-Oruba in East Bengal's 4–1 defeat. On 2 May 2012 he again scored the only goal in 1–2 defeat against Kazma Sporting Club at Kolkata.
