= 2009–10 East Bengal FC season =

Indian football club season

East Bengal
2009–10 season
- President: Dr Pranab Dasgupta
- Head-Coach: Subhash Bhowmick (until 25 October 2009); Philippe De Ridder (from 6 November 2009)
- Ground: Salt Lake Stadium; Barasat Stadium; East Bengal Ground
- I-League: 9th
- Calcutta Football League: 3rd
- Federation Cup: Champions
- IFA Shield: Group Stage
- Durand Cup: Group Stage
- E. K. Nayanar Cup: Group Stage
- AFC Cup: Group Stage
- Top goalscorer: League: Yusif Yakubu (9); All: Yusif Yakubu (13)
| Home colours | Away colours |

The 2009–10 season is East Bengal Football Club's 3rd season in the I-League, and also marks the club's 90th season. East Bengal will seek to win their first league trophy for 5 seasons, competing in the I-League, the Federation Cup and the AFC Cup.

== Squad ==
For the 2009–10 season.
Note: Flags indicate national team as defined under FIFA eligibility rules; some limited exceptions apply. Players may hold more than one non-FIFA nationality.

| No. | Pos. | Nation | Player |
|---|---|---|---|
| 1 | GK | IND | Abhra Mondal |
| — | GK | IND | Arup Debnath |
| — | GK | IND | Gurpreet Singh Sandhu |
| — | GK | IND | Priyant Kumar Singh |
| 2 | DF | IND | Ravinder Singh |
| 4 | DF | NGA | Uga Samuel Okpara |
| 19 | DF | IND | Syed Rahim Nabi [Captain] |
| 29 | DF | IND | Saumik Dey |
| 26 | DF | IND | Mehrajuddin Wadoo |
| — | DF | IND | Govin Singh |
| 3 | DF | IND | Nirmal Chettri |
| — | DF | IND | Wasim Feroz |
| — | DF | IND | Saheb Ali Mondal |
| — | DF | IND | Jeevan Singh |
| 33 | DF | IND | Saikat Saha Roy |
| — | DF | IND | Sayantan Das Roy |
| 7 | MF | IND | Harmanjot Singh Khabra |

| No. | Pos. | Nation | Player |
|---|---|---|---|
| - | MF | IND | Riston Rodrigues |
| 9 | MF | IND | Alvito D'Cunha |
| 24 | MF | IND | Mumtaz Akhtar |
| 32 | MF | IND | Beikhokhei Beingaichho |
| 14 | MF | IND | Mehtab Hossain |
| 12 | MF | IND | Renedy Singh |
| 11 | MF | IND | Sanju Pradhan |
| 17 | MF | IND | Chhangte Malsawmkima |
| 42 | MF | IND | Poibang Poshnua |
| 18 | MF | AUS | Srećko Mitrović |
| 15 | FW | IND | Baichung Bhutia |
| 25 | FW | GHA | Abel Hammond |
| 20 | FW | GHA | Yusif Yakubu |
| 6 | FW | IND | Subhash Singh |
| 6 | FW | IND | Budhiram Tudu |
| 6 | FW | IND | Bijen Singh |

- Coach: Philippe De Ridder
- Asst coach: Tushar Rakshit
- Goalkeeper coach: Atanu Bhattacharya
- Team doctor: Dr. S R Dasgupta
- Team manager: Swapan Ball, Gopal Ghosh

== Stadiums ==
Kingfisher East Bengal F.C. have been using both the Salt Lake Stadium and the East Bengal Ground sense Salt Lake Stadium opened in 1984. As of today the Salt Lake Stadium is used for East Bengal's I-League, AFC Cup, and Federation Cup games. The East Bengal Ground is used for the Calcutta Football League matches.

== Pre Season tour of Myanmar ==
In 2009, under coach Subhash Bhowmick, East Bengal FC toured Myanmar in August for a set of friendlies as a part of their pre-season campaign after a heavy training camp in Puri, Odisha. The Red and Gold brigade had imported players like Jan Berger, Omar Sebastián Monesterolo and Ramez Dayoub, however, the latter could not be a part of the team since his previous club Safa SC denied transfer clearance.

East Bengal played 4 friendly games in Myanmar against Myanmar National League teams, in which they won 2, drew 1 and lost 1 before returning to Kolkata.

=== Matches ===
Win Draw Loss

| 16 August 2009 Friendly | Yadanarbon | 2–1 | East Bengal | Bahtoo Stadium, Mandalay, Myanmar |
| | ?? | Report | Harmanjot Khabra |

| 19 August 2009 Friendly | Yangon United | 1–3 | East Bengal | Aung San Stadium, Yangon, Myanmar |
| | ?? | | Harmanjot Khabra; Edmilson Marques Pardal |

| 21 August 2009 Friendly | Okktha United | 0–1 | East Bengal | Aung San Stadium, Yangon, Myanmar |
| | | | Omar Sebastián Monesterolo |

| 23 August 2009 Friendly | Magwe | 2–2 | East Bengal | Thuwunna Stadium, Yangon, Myanmar |
| | | Report | Omar Sebastián Monesterolo; Beikhokhei Beingaichho |

== Competitions ==
=== Overall ===
| Competition | First match | Last match | Final position |
|---|---|---|---|
| IFA Shield | 3 September 2009 | 5 September 2009 | Group Stage |
| Durand Cup | 16 September 2009 | 18 September 2009 | Group Stage |
| Calcutta Football League | 21 October 2009 | 12 May 2010 | 3rd |
| I-League | 3 October 2009 | 27 May 2009 | 9th |
| Federation Cup | 22 December 2009 | 3 January 2010 | Champions |
| E.K. Nayanar Cup | 16 February 2010 | 19 February 2010 | Group Stage |
| AFC Cup | 10 March 2010 | 27 April 2010 | Group Stage |

=== Overview ===
| Competition | Record | | | | | | | |
| Competition | Pld | W | D | L | GF | GA | GD | Win % |
|---|---|---|---|---|---|---|---|---|
| IFA Shield | 2 | 0 | 0 | 2 | 3 | 7 | −4 | 0.00 |
| Durand Cup | 2 | 0 | 0 | 2 | 0 | 3 | −3 | 0.00 |
| Calcutta Football League | 15 | 8 | 6 | 1 | 34 | 9 | +25 | 53.33 |
| I-League | 26 | 7 | 10 | 9 | 27 | 31 | −4 | 26.92 |
| Federation Cup | 5 | 3 | 2 | 0 | 4 | 0 | +4 | 60.00 |
| E.K. Nayanar | 3 | 0 | 3 | 0 | 1 | 1 | +0 | 0.00 |
| AFC Cup | 6 | 0 | 0 | 6 | 5 | 20 | −15 | 0.00 |
| Total | 59 | 18 | 21 | 20 | 74 | 71 | +3 | 30.51 |

Last updated: 1 June 2010
Source: Competitions

=== IFA Shield ===
==== Group A ====
| Team | Pld | W | D | L | GF | GA | GD | Pts |
|---|---|---|---|---|---|---|---|---|
| (India) Chirag United | 2 | 1 | 1 | 0 | 5 | 3 | +2 | 4 |
| (India) Tata Football Academy | 2 | 1 | 1 | 0 | 4 | 2 | +2 | 4 |
| (India) East Bengal | 2 | 0 | 0 | 2 | 3 | 7 | −4 | 0 |

==== Fixtures & results ====
Win Draw Loss

| 3 September 2009 Group Stage | East Bengal | 1–3 | TFA | Barasat Stadium, Kolkata |
| 16:30 IST | Syed Rahim Nabi 40' | Report | Jagtar Singh 61'; Irfan Khan 87'; Robin Singh 89' |

| 5 September 2009 Group Stage | East Bengal | 2–4 | Chirag United | Barasat Stadium, Kolkata |
| 16:30 IST | Riston Rodrigues 21'; Subhash Singh | Report | Shylo Malsawmtluanga 7', 75'; Parveen Kumar 18'; Joshimar 90+1' | Referee: C.R. Srikrishna |

=== Durand Cup ===
Group D

| Team | Pld | W | D | L | GF | GA | GD | Pts |
|---|---|---|---|---|---|---|---|---|
| (India) Mahindra United | 2 | 1 | 1 | 0 | 2 | 0 | +2 | 4 |
| (India) Shillong Lajong | 2 | 1 | 1 | 0 | 1 | 0 | +1 | 4 |
| (India) East Bengal | 2 | 0 | 0 | 2 | 0 | 3 | −3 | 0 |

==== Fixtures & results ====
Win Draw Loss

| 16 September 2009 Group Stage | East Bengal | 0–1 | Shillong Lajong | Ambedkar Stadium, Delhi |
| 16:30 IST | | Report | Kyrshan Lynshing 60' |

| 18 September 2009 Group Stage | East Bengal | 0–2 | Mahindra United | Ambedkar Stadium, Delhi |
| 16:30 IST | | Report | Md. Rafi 62', 65' |

=== Calcutta Football League ===
==== Fixtures & results ====
Win Draw Loss

| 21 October 2009 1 | East Bengal | 4–0 | Eastern Railway | Barasat Stadium, Kolkata |
| 14:30 IST | Nirmal Chettri 34', 55'; Syed Rahim Nabi 42'; Budhiram Tudu 89' | Report | | Man of the Match: Nirmal Chettri (East Bengal) |

| 18 November 2009 2 | East Bengal | 2–2 | Railway FC | Salt Lake Stadium, Kolkata |
| 14:30 IST | Beikhokhei Beingaichho 30'; Srećko Mitrović 85' | Report | Sankha Roy Chowdhury 65' (pen.); Kaltu Hembrom 90+3' | Man of the Match: Kaltu Hembrom (Railway) |

| 27 November 2009 3 | East Bengal | 1–2 | Tollygunge Agragami | Salt Lake Stadium, Kolkata |
| 14:30 IST | Harmanjot Khabra 42' | Report | Nuruddin 14', 80' | Man of the Match: Nuruddin (Tollygunge Agragami) |

| 6 December 2009 4 | East Bengal | 4–2 | Calcutta Port Trust | Salt Lake Stadium, Kolkata |
| 14:30 IST | Budhiram Tudu 12', 72'; Abel Hammond 58'; Harmanjot Khabra 70' | Report | Henry 37', 45' | Man of the Match: Budhiram Tudu (East Bengal) |

| 9 December 2009 5 | East Bengal | 1–0 | Kalighat Club | Salt Lake Stadium, Kolkata |
| 14:30 IST | Budhiram Tudu 8' | Report | | Man of the Match: Kunal Ghosh (Kalighat) |

| 12 December 2009 6 | East Bengal | 0–0 | Chirag United | Salt Lake Stadium, Kolkata |
| 14:30 IST | | Report | | Man of the Match: Priyant Singh (East Bengal) |

| 7 February 2010 7 | East Bengal | 3–0 | WB Police | Salt Lake Stadium, Kolkata |
| 14:30 IST | Abel Hammond 50' (pen.), 60'; Alvito D'Cunha 90' | Report | | Man of the Match: Sanju Pradhan (East Bengal) |

| 10 February 2010 8 | East Bengal | 5–0 | Peerless | Salt Lake Stadium, Kolkata |
| 14:30 IST | Harmanjot Khabra 19'; Budhiram Tudu 78'; Abel Hammond 80'; Alvito D'Cunha 86'; Poibang Pohshna 89' | Report | | Man of the Match: Sanju Pradhan (East Bengal) |

| 12 February 2010 9 | East Bengal | 1–1 | Calcutta Customs | Salt Lake Stadium, Kolkata |
| 14:30 IST | Bijen Singh 45' | Report | Raja Sheikkh 39' | Man of the Match: Amit Rajbansi (Calcutta Customs) |

| 27 February 2010 10 | East Bengal | 0–0 | Mohammedan Sporting | Salt Lake Stadium, Kolkata |
| 14:30 IST | Uga Okpara (red card) 88'; Alvito D'Cunha (red card) 90' | Report | Eduardo (red card) 88'; Dipankar Roy (red card) 90' | Referee: Biplab Poddar; Man of the Match: Anupam Sarkar (Mohammedan SC) |

| 9 April 2010 11 | East Bengal | 6–1 | Kalighat MS | Sailen Manna Stadium, Howrah |
| 14:30 IST | Budhiram Tudu 30'; Sanju Pradhan 52', 62', 74'; Subhash Singh 80'; Kima 90' | Report | Subhankar Das 42' | Man of the Match: Sanju Pradhan (East Bengal) |

| 13 April 2010 12 | East Bengal | 3–1 | Mohammedan AC | Salt Lake Stadium, Kolkata |
| 14:30 IST | Renedy Singh 12' (pen.); Budhiram Tudu 23', 80' | Report | Md. Yasin 87' | Man of the Match: Mumtaz Akhtar (East Bengal) |

| 17 April 2010 13 | East Bengal | 0–0 | BNR | Sailen Manna Stadium, Howrah |
| 14:30 IST | | Report | | Man of the Match: Gurpreet Singh Sandhu (East Bengal) |

| 24 April 2010 14^{(KD)} | East Bengal | 0–0 | Mohun Bagan | Salt Lake Stadium, Kolkata |
| 14:30 IST | Harmanjot Khabra (red card) 73' | Report | | Man of the Match: Sanju Pradhan (East Bengal) |

| 12 May 2010 15 | East Bengal | 4–0 | George Telegraph | Salt Lake Stadium, Kolkata |
| 14:30 IST | Riston Rodrigues 35'; Budhiram Tudu 48', 74'; Abel Hammond 82' | Report | | Man of the Match: Budhiram Tudu (East Bengal) |

=== Federation Cup ===
Group A

| Team | Pld | W | D | L | GF | GA | GD | Pts |
|---|---|---|---|---|---|---|---|---|
| (India) East Bengal | 3 | 2 | 1 | 0 | 2 | 0 | +2 | 7 |
| (India) Salgaocar SC | 3 | 1 | 1 | 1 | 2 | 2 | 0 | 4 |
| (India) Viva Kerala | 3 | 0 | 3 | 0 | 1 | 1 | 0 | 3 |
| (India) JCT Mills Football Club | 3 | 0 | 1 | 2 | 0 | 2 | −2 | 1 |

==== Fixtures & results ====
Win Draw Loss

| 22 December 2009 Group Stage | East Bengal | 0–0 | Viva Kerala | Satindra Mohan Dev Stadium, Silchar |
| 14:30 IST |

| 24 December 2009 Group Stage | East Bengal | 1–0 | Salgaocar | Satindra Mohan Dev Stadium, Silchar |
| 14:30 IST | Yusif Yakubu 15' |

| 27 December 2009 Group Stage | East Bengal | 1–0 | JCT | Satindra Mohan Dev Stadium, Silchar |
| 14:30 IST | Bhaichung Bhutia 80' |

| 31 December 2009 Semi Final | East Bengal | 2–0 | Mohun Bagan | Nehru Stadium, Guwahati |
| 17:30 IST | Yusif Yakubu 46'; Mehtab Hossain 82' | | Jose Ramirez Barreto (penalty missed) |

| 3 January 2010 Final | Shillong Lajong | 0–0 (a.e.t.) (0–3 p) | East Bengal | Nehru Stadium, Guwahati |
| 17:30 IST | | Report |
| | Penalties |
| | Gurung (penalty missed); Ramengmawia (penalty missed); Lyngshing (penalty missed) | | Yakubu (penalty scored); Chettri (penalty scored); Khabra (penalty missed); Pradhan (penalty scored) |

=== E.K. Nayanar Gold Cup ===
==== Fixtures & results ====
Win Draw Loss

| 16 February 2010 Group Stage | East Bengal | 0–0 | Pune F.C. | Kannur |
| 14:30 IST |

| 18 February 2010 Group Stage | East Bengal | 1–1 | Chirag United | Kannur |
| 18:30 IST | Abel Hammond | | Edmilson Marques Pardal |

| 19 February 2010 Group Stage | East Bengal | 0–0 | Shillong Lajong F.C. | Kannur |
| 18:30 IST |

=== I League ===
==== League table ====
| Pos | Team | Pld | W | D | L | GF | GA | GD | Pts | Qualification or relegation |
|---|---|---|---|---|---|---|---|---|---|---|
| 7 | JCT | 26 | 8 | 8 | 10 | 26 | 29 | −3 | 32 | |
| 8 | Prayag United | 26 | 8 | 8 | 10 | 33 | 39 | −6 | 32 | |
| 9 | East Bengal | 26 | 7 | 10 | 9 | 27 | 31 | −4 | 31 | 2011 AFC Cup group stage (Note: East Bengal qualified for the 2011 AFC Cup as 2010 Indian Federation Cup winners.) |
| 10 | Viva Kerala | 26 | 7 | 9 | 10 | 25 | 36 | −11 | 30 | |
| 11 | Mumbai | 26 | 6 | 11 | 9 | 24 | 26 | −2 | 29 | |

Source: Soccerway
Rules for classification: 1) points; 2) goal difference; 3) number of goals scored.

==== Fixtures & results ====
Win Draw Loss

| 3 October 2009 1 | Pune F.C. | 0–0 | East Bengal | Pune Stadium, Pune |
| 18:30 IST |

| 7 October 2009 2 | Mahindra United F.C. | 3–2 | East Bengal | Cooperage Ground, Mumbai |
| 18:30 IST | Muritala Ali 30', 42'; N P Pradeep 78' | | Alvito D'Cunha 24'; Yusif Yakubu 64' |

| 11 October 2009 3 | East Bengal | 0–0 | JCT F.C. | Salt Lake Stadium, Kolkata |
| 17:30 IST |

| 25 October 2009 4^{(KD)} | East Bengal | 3–5 | Mohun Bagan | Salt Lake Stadium, Kolkata |
| 17:30 IST | Nirmal Chettri 9'; Yusif Yakubu 35', 44' | | Chidi Edeh 17', 33', 46', 66'; Manish Maithani 22' | Attendance: 90,000; Man of the Match: Chidi Edeh (Mohun Bagan) |

| 29 October 2009 5 | East Bengal | 1–1 | Salgaocar S.C. | Salt Lake Stadium, Kolkata |
| 17:30 IST | Abel Hammond 12' | | Ekene Ikenwa 88' |

| 2 November 2009 6 | Chirag Kerala | 0–1 | East Bengal | EMS Stadium, Kozhikode |
| 18:30 IST | | | Syed Rahim Nabi 11' |

| 7 November 2009 7 | Air India F.C. | 0–1 | East Bengal | Cooperage Ground, Mumbai |
| 18:30 IST | | | Abel Hammond 31' |

| 12 November 2009 8 | East Bengal | 3–0 | Shillong Lajong F.C. | Salt Lake Stadium, Kolkata |
| 18:30 IST | | | Abel Hammond 36', 90'; Yusif Yakubu 90' |

| 9 January 2010 9 | Chirag United SC | 1–0 | East Bengal | Salt Lake Stadium, Kolkata |
| 18:30 IST | Edmilson Marques Pardal 66' (pen.) |

| 16 January 2010 10 | Mumbai F.C. | 0–0 | East Bengal | Cooperage Ground, Mumbai |
| 18:30 IST |

| 22 January 2010 11 | East Bengal | 3–2 | Churchill Brothers S.C. | Salt Lake Stadium, Kolkata |
| 18:30 IST | Yusif Yakubu 11', 38'; Bhaichung Bhutia 52' | Report | Ogba Kalu 9'; Reisangmei Vashum 14' |

| 29 January 2010 12 | Dempo S.C. | 0–0 | East Bengal | Fatorda Stadium, Margao |
| 18:30 IST |

| 3 February 2010 13 | Sporting Clube de Goa | 0–1 | East Bengal | Fatorda Stadium, Margao |
| 18:30 IST | | | Yusif Yakubu 85' |

| 2 March 2010 14 | East Bengal | 1–2 | Pune F.C. | Salt Lake Stadium, Kolkata |
| 18:30 IST | Abel Hammond 85' (pen.) | | Douhou Pierre 46'; Edmar Figueira 54' |

| 6 March 2010 15 | Shillong Lajong F.C. | 1–0 | East Bengal | JL Nehru Stadium, Shillong |
| 18:30 IST | A Daniel 88' |

| 13 March 2010 16 | East Bengal | 1–1 | Mahindra United F.C. | Salt Lake Stadium, Kolkata |
| 18:30 IST | Mehtab Hossain 65' | | Mohammed Rafi 74' |

| 21 March 2010 17 | East Bengal | 0–2 | Air India F.C. | Salt Lake Stadium, Kolkata |
| 18:30 IST | | | K Patil 31'; N Opara 77' |

| 29 March 2010 18 | Salgaocar S.C. | 4–1 | East Bengal | JL Nehru Stadium, Shillong |
| 18:30 IST | Cajetan Fernandes 10'; Rouhollah Saminia 15'; Ekene Ikenwa 52', 59' | | Sanju Pradhan 27' |

| 15 April 2010 20 | East Bengal | 1–0 | Mumbai F.C. | Salt Lake Stadium, Kolkata |
| 18:30 IST | Yusif Yakubu 60' |

| 30 April 2010 21 | East Bengal | 1–1 | Sporting Clube de Goa | Salt Lake Stadium, Kolkata |
| 18:30 IST | Syed Rahim Nabi 40' | | Joseph Perreira 12' |

| 4 May 2010 22 | East Bengal | 2–1 | Chirag United | Salt Lake Stadium, Kolkata |
| 18:30 IST | Beikhokhei Beingaichho 40', 67' | | Joshimar 69' |

| 9 May 2010 23 | JCT F.C. | 1–1 | East Bengal | Guru Nanak Stadium, Ludhiana |
| 18:30 IST | Abel Hammond 65' | | Penn Orji 74' |

| 16 May 2010 24^{(KD)} | Mohun Bagan | 2–1 | East Bengal | Salt Lake Stadium, Kolkata |
| 18:30 IST | Jose Ramirez Barreto 14'; Snehasish Chakraborty 84' | | Yusif Yakubu 90' |

| 23 May 2010 25 | Churchill Brothers S.C. | 2–2 | East Bengal | Fatorda Stadium, Margao |
| 18:30 IST | Odafa Onyeka Okolie 36'; Felix Chimaokwu 57' (pen.) | | Mehtab Hossain 57'; Sanju Pradhan 68' (pen.) |

| 27 May 2010 26 | East Bengal | 1–1 | Chirag Kerala | Salt Lake Stadium, Kolkata |
| 18:30 IST | Budhiram Tudu 17' | | C. S. Sabeeth 10' |

=== AFC Cup ===
==== Group stage ====
| Team | Pld | W | D | L | GF | GA | GD | Pts | QAD | ITT | NEJ | EB |
|---|---|---|---|---|---|---|---|---|---|---|---|---|
| (Kuwait) Al-Qadsia | 6 | 4 | 2 | 0 | 14 | 5 | +9 | 14 | | 3–0 | 1–1 | 4–1 |
| (Syria) Al-Ittihad | 6 | 3 | 1 | 2 | 10 | 8 | +2 | 10 | 0–0 | | 4–2 | 2–1 |
| (Lebanon) Al-Nejmeh | 6 | 3 | 1 | 2 | 12 | 8 | +4 | 10 | 1–3 | 1–0 | | 3–0 |
| (India) Kingfisher East Bengal | 6 | 0 | 0 | 6 | 5 | 20 | −15 | 0 | 2–3 | 1–4 | 0–4 | |

Source: RSSSF

==== Fixtures & results ====
Win Draw Loss

| 10 March 2010 | East Bengal (India) | 1–4 | (Syria) Al-Ittihad | Salt Lake Stadium, Kolkata |
| 15:00 (UTC+5:30) | Yakubu 56' (pen.) | Report | Otobong 8'; Al Agha 29', 89'; Al Salal 90+1' | Attendance: 2,800; Referee: Võ Minh Trí (Vietnam) |

| 17 March 2010 | Al-Nejmeh (Lebanon) | 3–0 | (India) East Bengal | Camille Chamoun Stadium, Beirut |
| 18:00 (UTC+2) | Diop 19'; Atwi 23'; Najjarin 48' (pen.) | Report | | Attendance: 3,000; Referee: Mohd Nafeez Bin Abdul Wahab (Malaysia) |

| 24 March 2010 | East Bengal (India) | 2–3 | (Kuwait) Al-Qadsia | Salt Lake Stadium, Kolkata |
| 15:00 (UTC+5:30) | Singh 27'; Yakubu 68' | Report | Al-Mutwa 2', 85'; Al-Hussain 20' | Attendance: 1,000; Referee: Saleem Ali (Maldives) |

| 6 April 2010 | Al-Qadsia (Kuwait) | 4–1 | (India) East Bengal | Al-Hamad Stadium, Hawally |
| 18:30 (UTC+3) | Al-Magmed 30'; Mashaan 36'; Ajab 37'; Al-Mutwa 85' | Report | Hossain 59' | Attendance: 2,000; Referee: Fan Qi (China PR) |

| 20 April 2010 | Al-Ittihad (Syria) | 2–1 | (India) East Bengal | Aleppo International Stadium, Aleppo |
| 16:00 (UTC+3) | Kalasi 14'; Rashid 58' | Report | Beokhokhei 78' | Attendance: 3,000; Referee: Yadollah Jahanbazi (Iran) |

| 27 April 2010 | East Bengal (India) | 0–4 | (Lebanon) Al-Nejmeh | Salt Lake Stadium, Kolkata |
| 15:00 (UTC+5:30) | | Report | Atwi 3', 41'; Cisse 36'; Najarin 68' | Attendance: 1,500; Referee: Pandian Palaniyandi (Singapore) |

== Statistics ==
=== Appearances ===
Only for competitive fixtures.
Players with no appearances are not included in the list.

Appearances for East Bengal in 2009–10 season
| No. | Pos. | Nat. | Name | CFL | | I League | | Fed Cup | | IFA Shield | | Durand Cup | | E.K. Nayanar | | AFC Cup | | Total | |
| No. | Pos. | Nat. | Name | Apps | Starts | Apps | Starts | Apps | Starts | Apps | Starts | Apps | Starts | Apps | Starts | Apps | Starts | Apps | Starts |
Goalkeepers
| 1 | GK | (India) | Abhra Mondal | 3 | 3 | 17 | 17 | 5 | 5 | 1 | 1 | 1 | 1 | 1 | 1 | 3 | 3 | 31 | 31 |
| 30 | GK | (India) | Gurpreet Singh Sandhu | 3 | 3 | 6 | 6 | | | | | | | | | | | 9 | 9 |
| 24 | GK | (India) | Arup Debnath | | | 2 | 2 | 0 | 0 | 1 | 1 | 1 | 1 | | | | | 4 | 4 |
| 21 | GK | (India) | Avijit Ghosh | 4 | 4 | 1 | 1 | | | | | | | | | | | 5 | 5 |
| 31 | GK | (India) | Priyant Singh | 5 | 5 | | | | | | | | | 1 | 1 | 3 | 3 | 9 | 9 |
Defenders
| 19 | DF | (India) | Syed Rahim Nabi | 4 | 3 | 25 | 25 | 2 | 2 | 2 | 2 | 1 | 1 | | | 2 | 2 | 36 | 35 |
| 26 | DF | (India) | Mehrajuddin Wadoo | 1 | 1 | 22 | 22 | 5 | 4 | 1 | 1 | 1 | 1 | | | 5 | 4 | 35 | 33 |
| 4 | DF | (Nigeria) | Uga Okpara | 7 | 7 | 21 | 21 | 5 | 5 | | | | | | | 4 | 4 | 37 | 37 |
| 3 | DF | (India) | Nirmal Chettri | 3 | 3 | 19 | 19 | 5 | 5 | 1 | 1 | 1 | 1 | | | 4 | 4 | 33 | 33 |
| 34 | DF | (India) | Govin Singh | 3 | 3 | 10 | 10 | 0 | 0 | 2 | 2 | 2 | 1 | | | 3 | 3 | 20 | 19 |
| 29 | DF | (India) | Saumik Dey | 5 | 5 | 9 | 9 | 5 | 5 | 1 | 1 | 1 | 1 | 1 | 1 | 4 | 3 | 26 | 25 |
| 33 | DF | (India) | Saikat Saha Roy | 11 | 9 | 6 | 5 | 1 | 0 | 2 | 1 | | | 2 | 2 | 0 | 0 | 22 | 17 |
| 20 | DF | (India) | Poibang Pohshna | 10 | 9 | 3 | 3 | | | | | | | 2 | 2 | | | 15 | 14 |
| 2 | DF | (India) | Wasim Feroz | 10 | 9 | | | | | 1 | 1 | | | 2 | 2 | | | 13 | 12 |
| 16 | DF | (India) | Saheb Ali Mondal | 11 | 10 | | | | | | | 1 | 1 | 2 | 2 | 2 | 1 | 16 | 14 |
| 17 | DF | (India) | Jeevan Singh | 3 | 3 | | | | | | | 1 | 0 | | | | | 4 | 3 |
| | DF | (India) | Sayantan Das Roy | 2 | 2 | | | | | | | | | | | 2 | 2 | 4 | 4 |
| | DF | (India) | Sontu Das | 1 | 1 | | | | | | | | | | | | | 1 | 1 |
Midfielders
| 14 | MF | (India) | Mehtab Hossain | 9 | 9 | 25 | 25 | 4 | 4 | 2 | 2 | 1 | 1 | 1 | 1 | 5 | 5 | 47 | 47 |
| 22 | MF | (India) | Sanju Pradhan | 8 | 6 | 23 | 14 | 5 | 5 | 1 | 1 | 2 | 0 | 1 | 1 | 4 | 3 | 44 | 30 |
| 9 | MF | (India) | Alvito D'Cunha | 8 | 0 | 21 | 13 | 4 | 4 | | | 2 | 1 | 1 | 0 | 6 | 4 | 42 | 22 |
| 7 | MF | (India) | Harmanjot Khabra | 11 | 9 | 20 | 12 | 4 | 4 | 2 | 0 | 2 | 2 | 2 | 2 | 5 | 4 | 46 | 33 |
| 27 | MF | (India) | Beikhokhei Beingaichho | 8 | 7 | 16 | 13 | 2 | 2 | 1 | 1 | 2 | 1 | | | 4 | 4 | 33 | 28 |
| 8 | MF | (India) | Renedy Singh | 3 | 3 | 5 | 4 | | | | | 2 | 2 | | | 2 | 1 | 12 | 10 |
| 18 | MF | (India) | Riston Fernandes | 6 | 5 | 4 | 4 | 0 | 0 | 2 | 2 | 2 | 2 | 1 | 1 | | | 15 | 14 |
| 10 | MF | (Australia) | Srecko Mitrovic | 2 | 2 | 4 | 4 | | | | | | | | | | | 6 | 6 |
| 23 | MF | (India) | Mumtaz Akhtar | 11 | 10 | 4 | 1 | 2 | 0 | | | | | 2 | 2 | 2 | 2 | 21 | 15 |
| | MF | (Czech Republic) | Jan Berger | | | | | | | 1 | 1 | 1 | 1 | | | | | 2 | 2 |
| 28 | MF | (India) | Malswamkima | 7 | 4 | | | | | | | | | | | 2 | 0 | 9 | 4 |
| | MF | (India) | NG Beirona | 0 | 0 | | | | | | | | | 2 | 2 | | | 2 | 2 |
| | MF | (India) | Suman Dey | 4 | 4 | | | | | | | | | 1 | 1 | | | 5 | 5 |
Forwards
| 12 | FW | (Ghana) | Yusif Yakubu | | | 21 | 19 | 5 | 5 | | | | | | | 5 | 5 | 31 | 29 |
| 6 | FW | (Ghana) | Abel Hammond | 10 | 8 | 19 | 18 | | | | | | | 2 | 0 | 5 | 4 | 36 | 30 |
| 15 | FW | (India) | Bhaichung Bhutia | 2 | 0 | 15 | 9 | 3 | 0 | | | | | | | 2 | 2 | 22 | 11 |
| 24 | FW | (India) | Subhash Singh | 3 | 3 | 10 | 6 | 5 | 5 | 2 | 2 | 2 | 2 | | | 2 | 2 | 24 | 20 |
| 35 | FW | (India) | Budhiram Tudu | 11 | 7 | 7 | 4 | 3 | 0 | | | | | 1 | 1 | 2 | 1 | 24 | 13 |
| 30 | FW | (Brazil) | Edmilson Marques Pardal | | | | | | | 2 | 2 | | | | | | | 2 | 2 |
| 30 | FW | (Argentina) | Omar Sebastián Monesterolo | | | | | | | | | 2 | 2 | | | | | 2 | 2 |
| | FW | (India) | Abhijit Sarkar | 2 | 2 | | | | | | | | | | | | | 2 | 2 |
| 32 | FW | (India) | Goutam Khujur | 2 | 2 | | | | | 2 | 0 | | | | | | | 4 | 2 |
| 25 | FW | (India) | Bijen Singh | 4 | 4 | | | | | | | | | | | | | 4 | 4 |

=== Goal Scorers ===
Goals for East Bengal in 2009–10 season
| Rank | No. | Pos. | Nat. | Name | CFL | I-League | Fed Cup | IFA Shield | Durand | E.K. Nayanar | AFC Cup | Total |
|---|---|---|---|---|---|---|---|---|---|---|---|---|
| 1 | 12 | FW | (Ghana) | Yusif Yakubu | | 9 | 2 | | | | 2 | 13 |
| 2 | 6 | FW | (Ghana) | Abel Hammond | 5 | 6 | 0 | | | 1 | 0 | 12 |
| 3 | 35 | FW | (India) | Budhiram Tudu | 10 | 1 | 0 | 0 | 0 | 0 | 0 | 11 |
| 4 | 22 | MF | (India) | Sanju Pradhan | 3 | 2 | 0 | 0 | 0 | 0 | 0 | 5 |
| 5 | 14 | MF | (India) | Mehtab Hossain | 0 | 2 | 1 | 0 | 0 | 0 | 1 | 4 |
| 5 | 19 | DF | (India) | Syed Rahim Nabi | 1 | 2 | 0 | 1 | 0 | | 0 | 4 |
| 5 | 27 | MF | (India) | Beikhokhei Beingaichho | 1 | 2 | 0 | 0 | 0 | 0 | 1 | 4 |
| 8 | 3 | DF | (India) | Nirmal Chettri | 2 | 1 | 0 | 0 | 0 | | 0 | 3 |
| 8 | 24 | FW | (India) | Subhash Singh | 1 | 0 | 0 | 1 | 0 | | 1 | 3 |
| 8 | 7 | MF | (India) | Harmanjot Khabra | 3 | 0 | 0 | 0 | 0 | 0 | 0 | 3 |
| 8 | 9 | MF | (India) | Alvito D'Cunha | 2 | 1 | 0 | 0 | 0 | 0 | 0 | 3 |
| 12 | 15 | FW | (India) | Bhaichung Bhutia | 0 | 1 | 1 | | | | 0 | 2 |
| 12 | 18 | MF | (India) | Riston Rodrigues | 1 | 0 | 0 | 1 | 0 | | 0 | 2 |
| 14 | 8 | MF | (India) | Renedy Singh | 1 | 0 | | | | | 0 | 1 |
| 14 | 10 | MF | (Australia) | Srećko Mitrović | 1 | 0 | | | | | | 1 |
| 14 | 20 | MF | (India) | Poibang Pohshna | 1 | | | | | | | 1 |
| 14 | 25 | FW | (India) | Bijen Singh | 1 | | | | | | | 1 |
| 14 | 28 | MF | (India) | Malsawmkima | 1 | | | | | 0 | 0 | 1 |
| Own Goals | | | | | 0 | 0 | 0 | 0 | 0 | 0 | 0 | 0 |
| Total | | | | | 34 | 27 | 4 | 3 | 0 | 1 | 5 | 74 |

== Sponsors ==
- Main Sponsor: Kingfisher
