= 2003 Indian Federation Cup =

2003 Federation Cup
Tata Federation Cup

Tournament details
- Country: India
- Dates: 26 July–9 August 2003
- Teams: 16

Final positions
- Champions: Mahindra United (1st title)
- Runners-up: Mohammedan Sporting
- AFC Cup: Mahindra United

Tournament statistics
- Matches played: 15
- Goals scored: 35 (2.33 per match)
- Top goal scorer(s): Raphaël Patron Akakpo (3 goals)

The 2003 Indian Federation Cup (also known as 2003 Tata Federation Cup due to sponsorship reasons) was the 25th season of the Indian Federation Cup. It was held between 26 July and 9 August 2003. Defending champions Mohun Bagan were eliminated by Mohammedan Sporting in the semi-final, who faced Mahindra United in the final. Mahindra United went on to win their maiden title with Shanmugam Venkatesh scoring the winner for them in the 78th minute. Raphaël Patron Akakpo of Mahindra United finished the tournament as the top-scorer with three goals.

== Overview ==
The All India Football Federation announced on 11 May 2003 that the tournament would commence on 25 July 2003 and completed on 8 August. The date of commencement was revised to 26 July in an announcement made on 10 July. The tournament made a return after a year's break. The Vivekananda Yuba Bharati Krirangan in Kolkata was announced as the venue of the matches and that 16 teams would compete. The fixtures were announced on the same day. While all matches were played at the Vivekananda Yuba Bharati Krirangan in Kolkata, the third quarter-final between Mahindra United and Air India was played at the Sailen Manna Stadium (then called Howrah Municipal Stadium) in order "to rest and repair the pitch" (former stadium).

Two new features were added for the tournament. Doping tests were conducted according to guidelines laid down by FIFA in that "random sampling of a player of each team selected by the draw of lots" was conducted. Secondly, players and match officials were brought under a personal accident policy of ₹100,000, while the spectators, including the media, were covered under a similar policy of ₹50,000.

== Teams ==
All teams that competed in the 2002–03 season of the National Football League were included in the tournament alongside the top four teams from the National Football League Second Division, the hitherto second tier of the Indian football league system.

Team	Qualified from
Air India	National Football League Second Division
Churchill Brothers	National Football League
Dempo	National Football League
East Bengal	National Football League
Hindustan Aeronautics Limited	National Football League
Indian Bank	National Football League
Indian Telephone Industries	National Football League
JCT Mills	National Football League
Mahindra United	National Football League
Mohammedan Sporting	National Football League Second Division
Mohun Bagan	National Football League
Salgaocar	National Football League
State Bank of Travancore	National Football League Second Division
Sporting Clube	National Football League Second Division
Tollygunge Agragami	National Football League
Vasco	National Football League

== Results ==
In case of a tie at regular time, extra time with golden goal was used. In case scores remain tied even after extra time, penalty shoot-out was used.

=== Round of 16 ===
26 July 2003

Mohammedan Sporting	1–0	Indian Telephone Industries
Bungo Singh 61'	Report

Vivekananda Yuba Bharati Krirangan, Kolkata

26 July 2003

Salgaocar	4–0	Indian Bank
Lawrence 15', 69' (pen.); Sebastian Endro 22'; KS Singh 37'	Report(subscription required)

Vivekananda Yuba Bharati Krirangan, Kolkata

27 July 2003

Mohun Bagan	2–1	State Bank of Travancore
Marcos Pereira 20'; Barreto 55'	Report	Saheer 44'

Vivekananda Yuba Bharati Krirangan, Kolkata

27 July 2003

Churchill Brothers	0–0 (a.e.t.)	JCT Mills
	Report
Penalties
Rocky Barreto (penalty scored); Rajesh Meitei (penalty scored); Harvinder Singh (penalty scored); Rodrigues (penalty missed)	3–4	(penalty scored) Ancheri; (penalty scored) Jagjit Randhawa; (penalty scored) D. Singh; (penalty scored) Ram Paul

Vivekananda Yuba Bharati Krirangan, Kolkata

28 July 2003

Sporting Clube	0–1	Mahindra United
	Report	Yadav 76'

Vivekananda Yuba Bharati Krirangan, Kolkata

28 July 2003

Dempo	1–2	Air India
Jose Colaco 22' (pen.)	Report	Vinay Kuruvilla 48'; Fernandes 53'

Vivekananda Yuba Bharati Krirangan, Kolkata
Referee: N. Mohan

29 July 2003

Tollygunge Agragami	1–1	Vasco
Amit Das 42'	Report	Anthony Fernandes 88'
Penalties
Amit Das (penalty scored); Akeem Abolanle (penalty scored); Isiaka Awoyemi (penalty scored); Goutam Debnath (penalty scored); S. Dutta (penalty scored); Kajal Bhattacharjee (penalty missed)	5–6	(penalty scored) Menino Fernandes; (penalty scored) Denis Cabral; (penalty scored) Thapa; (penalty scored) Dias; (penalty scored) Jose; (penalty scored) Levy Coelho

Vivekananda Yuba Bharati Krirangan, Kolkata

31 July 2003

East Bengal	5–0	HAL
B. Singh 4', 31'; Chandan Das 58', 83'; D. Roy 68'	Report

Vivekananda Yuba Bharati Krirangan, Kolkata

=== Quarter-finals ===
30 July 2003

Salgaocar	0–5	Mohammedan Sporting
	Report	Sheikh Sanjib 24', 45'; Biswas 43', 70'; Nabi 69'

Vivekananda Yuba Bharati Krirangan, Kolkata

1 August 2003

Mohun Bagan	3–0	JCT Mills
Barreto 33'; R. Singh 44', 70'	Report

Vivekananda Yuba Bharati Krirangan, Kolkata

2 August 2003

Mahindra United	3–0	Air India
JL Singh 45+'; Venkatesh 67'; Akakpo 85'	Report

Howrah Municipal Corporation Stadium, Howrah

4 August 2003

Vasco	1–0	East Bengal
Mathew 85'	Report

Vivekananda Yuba Bharati Krirangan, Kolkata

=== Semi-finals ===
5 August 2003

Mohammedan Sporting	0–0 (a.e.t.)	Mohun Bagan
	Report
Penalties
Hussain Mustafi (penalty scored); Amandeep Singh (penalty scored); Amjad Ali Khan (penalty scored); L Akbar Singh (penalty scored); Arjan Ali (penalty scored)	5–4	(penalty scored) Barreto; (penalty scored) R. Singh; (penalty scored) Marcos Pereira; (penalty scored) Chhetri; (penalty missed) Basudeb Mondal

Vivekananda Yuba Bharati Krirangan, Kolkata
Attendance: 55,000
Referee: Komaleswaran Sankar

6 August 2003

Mahindra United	2–1	Vasco
Akakpo 17', 25'	Report	Ajayan 66'

Vivekananda Yuba Bharati Krirangan, Kolkata

=== Final ===
Mohammedan Sporting qualified for the final for the first time in 13 years and 11 editions of the tournament while Mahindra United, who progressed to the final in 1991 and 1993, had never won the title.

9 August 2003

Mohammedan Sporting	0–1	Mahindra United
	Report	Venkatesh 78'

Vivekananda Yuba Bharati Krirangan, Kolkata
Attendance: 65,000
