= Felix Aboagye =

Ghanaian footballer

Personal information
- Full name: Felix Ahmed Aboagye
- Date of birth: 5 December 1975 (age 50)
- Place of birth: Kumasi, Ghana
- Height: 1.73 m (5 ft 8 in)
- Position: Striker

Senior career*
Years	Team	Apps	(Gls)
1992	Dawu Youngstars		
1993–1998	Al Ahly	117	(47)
1998–1999	Olympiacos F.C.	11	(1)
1999–2000	Al-Nasr Sports Club		
2000–2001	Qatar Sports Club		
2001	Liberty Professionals F.C.		
2001–2002	Zamalek SC	20	(5)
2002–2003	Al Arabi Kuwait		
2003–2004	Mahindra United	17	(6)
2004–2005	Kingfisher East Bengal FC	14	(9)
2005	Cần Thơ FC		
2006	Khatoco Khánh Hoà		
2007	Club Valencia		
2007–2009	Mumbai FC		

International career
1994–2000	Ghana	26	(10)
- * Club domestic league appearances and goals as of 29 July 2007

Felix Ahmed Aboagye (born 5 December 1975) is a retired Ghanaian professional footballer who played primarily as a striker. He last professional club football for Mumbai FC in the I-League.

== International career ==
He represented his homeland by the 1998 African Cup of Nations in Burkina Faso and 1996 African Cup of Nations in South Africa. He was a member of the Ghana national football team at the 1996 Summer Olympics in Atlanta.

== Honours ==
Zamalek

- Egypt Cup: 2002
- Egyptian Super Cup: 2001–02

Mahindra United

- POMIS Cup: 2003
