= Indian football clubs in Asian competitions =

Indian football clubs have entered several Asian football competitions since the 1960s. The Asian Champion Club Tournament started in 1967, but there was no Indian representative during that inaugural season. Indian teams have participated every year in Asia, except for the early years between the 1990s and early 2000s.

== Slots for Asian competitions ==
Competition	Slots	Teams
Men's
AFC Challenge League Qualifier	Indian Super League champion	1
Women's
AFC Women's Champions League Qualifier	Indian Women's League champion	1
SAFF Women's Club Championship	Indian Women's League champion	1

== Regions allotted for Asian competitions ==
Season	Top tier	Second tier	Third tier
1985–1994	Mixed	—N/a	—N/a
1994–2003	East	—N/a	—N/a
2004–2005	East		—N/a
2006	East	West	—N/a
2007	East		—N/a
2009–2013	West		—N/a
2013–2016	East		—N/a
2017–2024	West	South	—N/a
2024–	West		

== AFC men's competitions record ==
=== AFC Champions League Elite/AFC Champions League/Asian Club Championship/Asian Champion Club Tournament ===
Year	Team	Progress	Score	Opponents	Venue(s)
Asian Champion Club Tournament^{1}
1967	Railways	~~Semi-finals~~	w/o	(Israel) Hapoel Tel Aviv	Withdrew due to excessive travel costs
1969	Mysore State	Fourth Place	0–2	(Japan) Toyo Kogyo	National Stadium, Bangkok
1970	Bengal	3rd in Group Stage	N/A	(Israel) Hapoel Tel Aviv (Indonesia) PSMS Medan (Thailand) Royal Thai Police	
1971	Punjab	4th in Group Stage	N/A	(Thailand) Bangkok Bank (Israel) Maccabi Tel Aviv (Iraq) Aliyat Al-Shorta	
1972–84	The tournament was not held				
Asian Club Championship^{2}
1985–86	East Bengal	3rd in Group Semi's	N/A	(Saudi Arabia) Al-Ahli (Indonesia) Krama Yudha Tiga Berlian	
1986	None Entered				
1987	Mohun Bagan	2nd in Group Stage	N/A	(Iraq) Al-Rasheed (Bangladesh) Dhaka Mohammedan (Nepal) Manang Marsyangdi (Pakistan) PAF	
1988–89	Mohun Bagan	4th in Group Semi's	N/A	(Iraq) Al-Rasheed (China) Guangdong Wanbao (Kuwait) Kazma	
1989–90	Salgaocar	2nd in Group Stage	N/A	(Oman) Fanja (Pakistan) Punjab (Nepal) Kathmandu	
1990–91	Salgaocar	2nd in Group Stage	N/A	(Bangladesh) Dhaka Mohammedan (Maldives) Club Lagoons	
1991	None Entered				
1992–93	None Entered				
1993–94	None Entered				
1994–95	Mohun Bagan	2nd Round	0–7	(Thailand) Thai Farmers Bank	0–4 in Thailand; 0–3 (w/o) as Mohun Bagan refused to travel
1995	Mohun Bagan	1st Round	2–2	(Maldives) Club Valencia	2–1 in First Match; 0–1 in Second Match
1996–97	JCT	2nd Round	1–2	(Maldives) New Radiant	1–0 in First Match; 0–2 in Second Match
1997–98	Churchill Brothers	1st Round	1–2	(Vietnam) Cao su Đồng Tháp	0–1 in First Match; 1–1 in Second Match
1998–99	East Bengal	1st Round	0–6	(China) Dalian Wanda	0–6 in First Match; 0–0 in Second Match
1999–00	Mohun Bagan	2nd Round	0–8	(Japan) Júbilo Iwata	0–8 at Yamaha Stadium, Iwata cancelled as Mohun Bagan refused to host
2000–01	None Entered				
2001–02	None Entered				
AFC Champions League
2002–03	Churchill Brothers	Qualifying Round 3	4–7	(Thailand) Osotsapa	1–1 Home; 3–6 Away
2002–03	Mohun Bagan	Qualifying Round 3	1–8	(South Korea) Daejeon Citizen	6–0 Away; 1–2 Home
2004	Not Eligible				
2005	Not Eligible				
2006	Not Eligible				
2007	Not Eligible				
2008	Not Eligible				
2009	Dempo	Play-off round	0–3	(United Arab Emirates) Sharjah	Sharjah Stadium, Sharjah
2010	Churchill Brothers	Qualifying play-off	2–5	(United Arab Emirates) Al-Wahda	Al-Nahyan Stadium, Abu Dhabi
2011	Dempo	Qualifying play-off	0–2	(Qatar) Al-Sadd	Jassim bin Hamad Stadium, Doha
2012	Not Eligible				
2013	Not Eligible				
2014	Pune	Qualifying play-off Round 1	0–3	(Vietnam) Hà Nội T&T	Shree Shiv Chhatrapati Sports Complex, Pune
2015	Bengaluru	Preliminary Round 1	1–2	(Malaysia) Johor Darul Ta'zim	Larkin Stadium, Johor Bahru
2016	Mohun Bagan	Preliminary Round 2	0–6	(China) Shandong Luneng Taishan	Jinan Olympic Sports Center Stadium, Jinan
2017	Bengaluru	Preliminary Round 2	1–2	(Jordan) Al-Wehdat	King Abdullah II Stadium, Amman
2018	Aizawl	Play-off round	1–3	(Iran) Zob Ahan	Foolad Shahr Stadium, Isfahan
2019	Minerva Punjab	Preliminary Round 2	0–4	(Iran) Saipa	Shahr-e Qods Stadium, Qods
2020	Chennai City	Preliminary Round 1	0–1	(Bahrain) Al-Riffa	The Arena, Ahmedabad
2021	Goa	3rd in Group Stage	N/A	(Iran) Persepolis (Qatar) Al-Rayyan (United Arab Emirates) Al-Wahda	Fatorda Stadium, Margao
2022	Mumbai City	2nd in Group Stage	N/A	(Saudi Arabia) Al Shabab (United Arab Emirates) Al Jazira (Iraq) Al-Quwa Al-Jawiya	Prince Faisal bin Fahd Stadium, Riyadh; King Fahd International Stadium, Riyadh
2023–24	Mumbai City	4th in Group Stage	N/A	(Saudi Arabia) Al Hilal (Uzbekistan) Navbahor (Iran) Nassaji Mazandaran	Various
AFC Champions League Elite
2024–25	Not Eligible				
2025–26	Not Eligible				
2026–27	Not Eligible				
2027–28	Not Eligible				

^{1} Santosh Trophy winners entered tournament.
^{2} Federation Cup winners entered tournament.

=== Asian Cup Winners' Cup ===
Year	Team	Progress	Score	Opponents	Venue(s)
1990–91	Mohun Bagan	First Round	0–5	(China) Dalian	0–1 in First leg 0–4 in Second leg
1991–92	East Bengal	Quarterfinals	1–7	(Japan) Nissan	1–3 in First leg 0–4 in Second leg
1992–93	Mohammedan	First Round	w/o^{1}	(Oman) Fanja	Withdrew
1993–94	East Bengal	Second Round	1–5	(Hong Kong) South China	0–1 in First leg 1–4 in Second leg
1994–95	East Bengal	First Round	w/o^{2}	Telephone Org. Thailand	1–4 in First leg Withdrew after first leg
1995–96	East Bengal	Second Round	2–3	(Maldives) New Radiant	0–3 in First leg 2–0 in Second leg
1996–97	None Entered				
1997–98	East Bengal	Second Round	3–5	(Japan) Verdy Kawasaki	2–5 in First leg 1–0 in Second leg
1998–99	Salgaocar	First Round	1–4	(China) Beijing Guoan	1–0 in First leg 0–4 in Second leg
1999–2000	None Entered				
2000–01	None Entered				
2001–02	None Entered				

^{1} Mohammedan withdrew.
^{2} East Bengal withdrew after first leg.

=== AFC Champions League Two/AFC Cup ===
Year	Team	Progress	Score	Opponents	Venue(s)
AFC Cup^{1}
2004	Mahindra United	3rd in Group Stage	N/A	(Syria) Al-Wahda (Oman) Dhofar	
2004	East Bengal	Quarter finals	0–3	(Syria) Al-Jaish	0–0 at Salt Lake Stadium, Kolkata; 0–3 at King Abdullah Stadium, Amman
2005	Dempo	3rd in Group Stage	N/A	(Jordan) Al-Hussein (Lebanon) Al Ahed	
2005	East Bengal	3rd in Group Stage	N/A	(Jordan) Al-Faisaly (Turkmenistan) Nebitçi Balkanabat (Bangladesh) Muktijoddha Sangsad KS	
2006	Dempo	2nd in Group Stage	N/A	(Oman) Al-Nasr (Turkmenistan) Merv Mary	
2006	Mahindra United	3rd in Group Stage	N/A	(Bahrain) Al-Muharraq (Lebanon) Al Ahed (Bangladesh) Brothers Union	
2007	Mohun Bagan	2nd in Group Stage	N/A	(Singapore) Tampines Rovers (Thailand) Osotspa (Malaysia) Pahang FA	
2007	Mahindra United	Quarter-Final	4–5	(Lebanon) Al-Nejmeh	1–2 at Fatorda Stadium, Margao; 3–3 at Sports City Stadium, Beirut
2008	East Bengal	3rd in Group Stage	N/A	(Lebanon) Safa (Jordan) Al-Wehdat (Yemen) Al-Ahli Club Sana'a	
2008	Dempo	Semi-Final	1–5	(Lebanon) Safa	0–1 at Sports City Stadium, Beirut; 1–4 at Gachibowli Athletic Stadium, Hyderabad
2009	Mohun Bagan	4th in Group Stage	N/A	Al-Kuwait (Syria) Al-Karamah (Jordan) Al-Wehdat	
2009	Dempo	Round of 16	1–3	Al-Kuwait	Al Kuwait Sports Club Stadium, Kuwait City
2010	East Bengal	4th in Group Stage	N/A	(Kuwait) Al-Qadsia (Syria) Al-Ittihad (Lebanon) Al-Nejmeh	
2010	Churchill Brothers	Round of 16	1–2	(Kuwait) Al-Qadsia	Mohammed Al-Hamad Stadium, Hawally
2011	East Bengal	4th in Group Stage	N/A	(Thailand) Chonburi (Indonesia) Persipura Jayapura (Hong Kong) South China AA	
2011	Dempo	Round of 16	0–1	(Iraq) Duhok	Duhok Stadium, Duhok
2012	East Bengal	4th in Group Stage	N/A	(Iraq) Arbil (Kuwait) Kazma (Yemen) Al-Oruba	
2012	Salgaocar	4th in Group Stage	N/A	(Jordan) Al-Wehdat (Uzbekistan) Neftchi Farg'ona (Oman) Al-Oruba	
2013	East Bengal	Semi-Final	2–7	Al-Kuwait	2–4 at Al Kuwait Sports Club Stadium, Kuwait City; 0–3 at Salt Lake Stadium, Kolkata
2013	Churchill Brothers	3rd in Group Stage	N/A	(Hong Kong) Kitchee (Indonesia) Semen Padang (Singapore) Warriors	
2014	Churchill Brothers	Round of 16	2–4	(Vietnam) Vissai Ninh Bình	
2014	Pune	4th in Group Stage	N/A	(Hong Kong) Kitchee (Myanmar) Nay Pyi Taw (Singapore) Tampines Rovers	
2015	Bengaluru	Round of 16	0–2	(Hong Kong) South China	Mong Kok Stadium, Hong Kong
2015	East Bengal	3rd in Group Stage	N/A	(Malaysia) Johor Darul Ta'zim (Hong Kong) Kitchee (Singapore) Balestier Khalsa	
2016	Mohun Bagan	Round of 16	1–2	(Singapore) Tampines Rovers	Indira Gandhi Athletic Stadium, Guwahati
2016	Bengaluru	Runners-Up	0–1	(Iraq) Al-Quwa Al-Jawiya	Saoud bin Abdulrahman Stadium, Al Wakrah
2017	Bengaluru	Inter-zone play-off final	2–3	(Tajikistan) Istiklol	0–1 at Central Stadium, Dushanbe; 2–2 at Sree Kanteerava Stadium, Bengaluru
2017	Mohun Bagan	3rd in Group stage	N/A	(India) Bengaluru (Bangladesh) Dhaka Abahani (Maldives) Maziya S&RC	
2018	Aizawl	4th in Group stage	N/A	(India) Bengaluru (Bangladesh) Dhaka Abahani (Maldives) New Radiant	
2018	Bengaluru	Inter-zone play-off semi-final	2–5	(Turkmenistan) Altyn Asyr	2–3 at Sree Kanteerava Stadium, Bengaluru; 0–2 at Köpetdag Stadium, Ashgabat
2019	Minerva Punjab	3rd in Group stage	N/A	(India) Chennaiyin (Bangladesh) Dhaka Abahani (Nepal) Manang Marshyangdi Club	
2019	Chennaiyin	2nd in Group stage	N/A	(India) Minerva Punjab (Bangladesh) Dhaka Abahani (Nepal) Manang Marshyangdi Club	
2020	Chennai City	Group Stage	Cancelled	(Bangladesh) Bashundhara Kings (Maldives) Maziya (Maldives) T.C. Sports Club	Season suspended due to the COVID-19 pandemic
2020	Bengaluru	Qualifying Play-off	4–4 (3–4 p)	(Maldives) Maziya	2–1 at National Football Stadium, Malé; 3–2 at Sree Kanteerava Stadium, Bengaluru
2021	ATK Mohun Bagan	Inter-zone play-off semi-final	0–6	(Uzbekistan) Nasaf	Markaziy Stadium, Qarshi
2021	Bengaluru	3rd in Group Stage	N/A	(India) ATK Mohun Bagan (Bangladesh) Bashundhara Kings (Maldives) Maziya	National Football Stadium, Malé
2022	Gokulam Kerala	4th in Group Stage	N/A	(Bangladesh) Bashundhara Kings (Maldives) Maziya (India) ATK Mohun Bagan	Salt Lake Stadium, Kolkata
2022	ATK Mohun Bagan	Inter-zone play-off semi-final	1–3	(Malaysia) Kuala Lumpur City	Salt Lake Stadium, Kolkata
2023–24	Odisha	Inter-zone play-off semi-final	0–4	(Australia) Central Coast Mariners	0–4 at Central Coast Stadium, Gosford; 0–0 at Kalinga Stadium, Bhubaneswar
2023–24	Mohun Bagan SG	3rd in Group stage	N/A	(Bangladesh) Bashundhara Kings (Maldives) Maziya (India) Odisha	
AFC Champions League Two
2024–25	Mohun Bagan SG	~~Group stage~~	N/A	(Tajikistan) Ravshan Kulob (Qatar) Al-Wakrah (Iran) Tractor	Withdrawn after failing to appear for their fixture
2024–25	East Bengal	Qualifying playoff	2–3	(Turkmenistan) Altyn Asyr	2–3 at Salt Lake Stadium, Kolkata
2025–26	Mohun Bagan SG	~~Group stage~~	N/A	(Iran) Sepahan (Jordan) Al-Hussein (Turkmenistan) Ahal	Withdrawn after failing to appear for their fixture
2025–26	Goa	4th in Group stage	N/A	(Saudi Arabia) Al-Nassr (Iraq) Al-Zawraa (Tajikistan) Istiklol	
2026–27	East Bengal				
2026–27	Goa	Qualifying playoff	0–3	(Turkmenistan) Arkadag	0–3 at Arkadag Stadium, Arkadag
2027–28	Not Eligible				

=== AFC Challenge League/AFC President's Cup ===
Year	Team	Progress	Score	Opponents	Venue(s)
AFC President's Cup^{1}
2005	Eligible for AFC Cup				
2006	Eligible for AFC Cup				
2007	Eligible for AFC Cup				
2008	Eligible for AFC Cup				
2009	Eligible for AFC Cup				
2010	Eligible for AFC Cup				
2011	Eligible for AFC Cup				
2012	Eligible for AFC Cup				
2013	Eligible for AFC Cup				
2014	Eligible for AFC Cup				
AFC Challenge League
2024–25	East Bengal	Quarterfinals	1–3	(Turkmenistan) Arkadag	0–1 at Salt Lake Stadium, Kolkata; 1–2 at Arkadag Stadium, Arkadag
2025–26	Eligible for AFC Champions League Two				
2026–27	Goa	3rd in Group stage	N/A	(Kuwait) Al-Qadsia (Tajikistan) Regar-TadAZ (Bangladesh) Fortis	Mohammed Al-Hamad Stadium, Hawally

== AFC women's competitions record ==
=== AFC Women's Champions League/AFC Women's Club Championship ===
Year	Team	Progress	Score	Opponents	Venue(s)
AFC Women's Club Championship^{1}
2019	Only for East Region				
2021	Gokulam Kerala^{2}	Third place	N/A	(Jordan) Amman (Iran) Shahrdari Sirjan (Uzbekistan) Bunyodkor	Aqaba Development Corporate Stadium, Amman
2022	Gokulam Kerala	~~Group stage~~	N/A	(Iran) Bam Khatoon (Uzbekistan) Sogdiana (Jordan) ~~Orthodox~~	Markaziy Stadium, Qarshi; Could not participate due to AIFF suspension
2023	Gokulam Kerala	2nd in Group Stage	N/A	(Japan) Urawa Red Diamonds (Chinese Taipei) Hualien (Thailand) Bangkok	Chonburi Stadium, Chonburi
AFC Women's Champions League
2024–25	Odisha	4th in Group Stage	N/A	(Chinese Taipei) Taichung Blue Whale (Japan) Urawa Red Diamonds (Vietnam) Hồ Chí Minh City	Thống Nhất Stadium, Ho Chi Minh City
2025–26	East Bengal	3rd in Group Stage	N/A	(China) Wuhan Jiangda (Uzbekistan) Nasaf (Iran) Bam Khatoon	Tazihu Football Training Centre, Wuhan
2026–27	East Bengal				

== SAFF men's competitions record ==
=== SAFF Club Championship ===
Year	Team	Progress	Score	Opponents	Venue(s)
SAFF Club Championship

== SAFF women's competitions record ==
=== SAFF Women's Club Championship ===
Year	Team	Progress	Score	Opponents	Venue(s)
SAFF Women's Club Championship
2025	East Bengal	1st in Group Stage & Playoffs : Champion	N/A	(Nepal) APF (Bangladesh) Nasrin (Bhutan) Transport United (Pakistan) Karachi City	Dasharath Rangasala, Kathmandu

== AFF men's competitions record ==
=== ASEAN Club Championship ===
As invitees

Year	Team	Progress	Score	Opponents	Venue(s)
ASEAN Club Championship
2003	East Bengal	Champion	3–1	(Thailand) BEC Tero Sasana	Gelora Bung Karno Stadium, Jakarta

== Other Asian competitions record ==
=== Invitational competitions won by Indian clubs/teams ===
Clubs/teams	Tournaments	Federation	Countries	Years	Notes
Indian Army	Tribhuvan Challenge Shield	ANFA	Nepal	1955, 1956	
Mohammedan Sporting	Aga Khan Gold Cup	EPSF	East Pakistan	1960	
Birpur XI	Tribhuvan Challenge Shield	ANFA	Nepal	1967	
Brothers Club Kerala	Tribhuvan Challenge Shield	ANFA	Nepal	1969	
Bangalore XI	Tribhuvan Challenge Shield	ANFA	Nepal	1982	
Punjab Electricity Board	Tribhuvan Challenge Shield	ANFA	Nepal	1984	
Darjeeling United	Birthday Cup	ANFA	Nepal	1985	
East Bengal	Central Asia Champions' Cup	AFC	Sri Lanka	1985	
East Bengal	Wai Wai Cup	ANFA	Nepal	1993	
Kerala SC	POMIS Cup	FAM	Maldives	1993	
Belgeria SC	Budha Subba Gold Cup	ANFA	Nepal	1999	
Mahindra United	POMIS Cup	FAM	Maldives	2003	
East Bengal	San Miguel International Cup	ANFA	Nepal	2004	

== Statistics ==
=== Head to head (men's) ===
Head-to-head records against clubs from 36 nations whom they have played to date in official competitions.

Against	Region	P	W	D	L	GF	GA	GD	%Win
Australia	AFF	2	0	1	1	0	4	−4	0.00
Bangladesh	SAFF	35	16	11	8	52	34	+18	45.71
Bahrain	WAFF	7	1	2	4	4	10	−6	14.29
Bhutan	SAFF	5	3	2	0	15	3	+12	60.00
China	EAFF	8	1	1	6	1	27	−26	12.50
Hong Kong	EAFF	16	4	4	8	22	31	−9	25.00
Indonesia	AFF	14	2	5	7	13	25	−12	14.29
Iran	CAFA	6	0	0	6	2	17	−15	0.00
Iraq	WAFF	14	3	0	11	13	30	−17	21.43
Israel	–	3	0	0	3	3	13	−10	0.00
Japan	EAFF	6	1	0	5	4	22	−18	16.67
Jordan	WAFF	14	3	1	10	16	37	−21	21.43
Kuwait	WAFF	16	1	1	14	17	52	−35	6.25
Laos	AFF	2	1	0	1	3	3	+0	50.00
Lebanon	WAFF	17	4	4	9	18	30	−12	23.53
Malaysia	AFF	14	5	2	7	19	23	−4	35.71
Maldives	SAFF	46	33	4	9	112	47	+65	71.74
Myanmar	AFF	7	4	3	0	20	12	+8	57.14
Nepal	SAFF	14	10	4	0	51	11	+40	71.43
Oman	WAFF	13	4	1	8	17	24	−7	30.77
North Korea	EAFF	2	1	1	0	3	0	+3	50.00
Pakistan	SAFF	4	3	1	0	14	1	+13	75.00
Philippines	AFF	2	2	0	0	8	1	+7	100.00
Qatar	WAFF	3	0	2	1	1	3	−2	0.00
Saudi Arabia	WAFF	7	0	0	7	2	25	−23	0.00
Singapore	AFF	24	12	4	8	38	30	+8	50.00
Syria	WAFF	10	1	2	7	5	21	−16	10.00
South Korea	EAFF	3	0	0	3	1	13	−12	0.00
Sri Lanka	SAFF	10	8	1	1	24	6	+18	80.00
Tajikistan	CAFA	5	0	1	4	4	9	−5	0.00
Thailand	AFF	14	3	4	7	16	32	−16	21.43
Turkmenistan	CAFA	10	2	1	7	18	22	−4	20.00
United Arab Emirates	WAFF	6	0	2	4	0	11	−11	0.00
Uzbekistan	CAFA	7	0	1	6	3	29	−26	0.00
Vietnam	AFF	9	3	2	4	11	12	−1	33.33
Yemen	WAFF	8	4	1	3	9	10	−1	50.00
Total	36 nations	383	135	69	179	559	680	−121	35.25

- Last updated on 3 November 2026.

=== Head to head (women's) ===
Head-to-head record against clubs from 19 nations whom they have played to date in official competitions.

Against	Region	P	W	D	L	GF	GA	GD	%Win
Bangladesh	SAFF	2	2	0	0	11	0	+11	100.00
Bhutan	SAFF	1	1	0	0	4	0	+4	100.00
Cambodia	AFF	1	1	0	0	1	0	+1	100.00
China	EAFF	1	0	0	1	0	2	−2	0.00
Guam	EAFF	1	1	0	0	12	0	+12	100.00
Hong Kong	EAFF	1	0	1	0	1	1	+0	0.00
Iran	CAFA	2	1	0	1	3	2	+1	50.00
Japan	EAFF	2	0	0	2	0	25	−25	0.00
Jordan	WAFF	2	1	0	1	3	3	+0	50.00
North Korea	EAFF	1	0	0	1	0	2	−2	0.00
South Korea	EAFF	1	0	0	1	1	4	−3	0.00
Malaysia	AFF	1	1	0	0	2	0	+2	100.00
Nepal	SAFF	2	1	1	0	3	0	+3	50.00
Pakistan	SAFF	1	1	0	0	2	0	+2	100.00
Singapore	AFF	1	1	0	0	4	1	+3	100.00
Chinese Taipei	EAFF	2	0	1	1	1	5	−4	0.00
Thailand	AFF	1	1	0	0	4	3	+1	100.00
Uzbekistan	CAFA	2	1	0	1	3	4	−1	50.00
Vietnam	AFF	2	1	0	1	3	4	−1	50.00
Total	19 nations	27	14	3	10	58	56	+2	51.85

- Last Updated on 7 November 2026.

=== Top scorers ===
As of 30 June 2019

Pos	Player	Team	ACL2/AC	ACL/ACC	ACWC	Total
1	(Nigeria) Ranti Martins	Dempo; East Bengal	22	—	—	22
2	(India) Sunil Chhetri	Churchill Brothers; Bengaluru FC	18	1	—	19
3	(India) Bhaichung Bhutia	East Bengal; JCT; Mohun Bagan	4	2	8	14
4	(India) Sisir Ghosh	Mohun Bagan	—	11	2	13
4	(India) Jeje Lalpekhlua	Mohun Bagan	12	1	—	13
6	(Brazil) Beto	Dempo	12	—	—	12
7	(Nigeria) Chidi Edeh	Dempo; East Bengal	9	—	—	9
8	(India) Debasish Roy	East Bengal	—	8	—	8
9	(India) Carlton Chapman	East Bengal; JCT	—	1	5	6
9	(Brazil) Cristiano Junior	East Bengal	6	—	—	6
9	(Haiti) Sony Norde	Mohun Bagan	6	—	—	6
9	(Ghana) Yusif Yakubu	Mahindra United; East Bengal	6	—	—	6

== See also ==
- AFC Champions League Elite
- AFC Champions League Two
- AFC Challenge League
- Indian Super League
- I-League
- Indian football league system

== Notes ==
1. Groups included South Asian clubs with either Central or West Asian club or sometimes only South Asia
2. In 2011 AFC Cup, Indian clubs were allotted in both West and East Asia regions
3. While SAFF was kept in West Asia region, India and Maldives were kept in East Asia
4. Joined AFC in 2006 from OFC and AFF in 2013
5. Joined CAFA in 2015 from WAFF
6. Part of AFC until 1974
