= Raphaël Patron Akakpo =

Togolese footballer

Akakpo Patron
Personal information
- Full name: Raphaël Patron Akakpo
- Date of birth: 1 December 1973 (age 52)
- Position: Striker

Senior career*
Years	Team	Apps	(Gls)
–1991	Prampram Mighty Royals		
1991–1995	Asante Kotoko		
1995–1996	Ghapoha		
1997	Tero Sasana		(15)
1997–1999	Brunei		(31)
2000–2001	Liberty Professionals		
2001	Sabina		
2002	Brunei		(0)
2003	Terengganu	0	(0)
2003	Sabina		(8)
2003–2005	Mahindra United		
2005–2006	Khanh Hoa		(1)

International career
1998–2001	Togo		

Managerial career
- 2014–2017: WAFA SC (assistant)
- 2016: WAFA SC (interim)
- 2017–2021: Asante Kotoko (assistant)
- 2022: Cheetah
- 2022–2023: Kotoku Royals
- 2023–2024: Victory Club Warriors
- 2025: Golden Warriors (assistant)
- * Club domestic league appearances and goals

Raphaël Patron Akakpo (born 1 December 1973) is a Togolese retired professional footballer. He has spent time in Ghana, Thailand, Brunei, Malaysia, India, and Vietnam during his professional career, as well as played for the Togo national football team.

== Playing career ==
=== Brunei and Malaysia ===
Patron arrived in Brunei at the start of the 1997 Liga Perdana Malaysia to play for the Bruneian national football team playing in the Malaysian league. By then, he had 15 international caps for Togo and was on the books of Tero Sasana of Thailand, scoring 15 goals in the previous term. Coached by influential Englishman David Booth, Patron amassed 15 goals in the league while Brunei finished fifth and were semi-finalists of the Malaysia Cup.

Patron was retained by Booth for the following campaign, where the foreign trio of Brian Bothwell, Zannoun Farouk and the Togolese striker propelled Brunei to a highest-ever third place in the 1998 Liga Perdana 1.

The pinnacle of Patron's career with Brunei came in the 1999 season, when he hoisted the Malaysia Cup after a 2–1 victory at Stadium Merdeka that year.

Discharged by Brunei in 2002, Patron was signed by Terengganu FA in early 2003; however, since his transfer breached M-League rules, Terengganu were not allowed to sign him despite pleading to the Football Association of Malaysia.

=== India ===
Lifting the 2003 Indian Federation Cup with Mahindra United, Patron mustered a brace in a 3–1 league win over Sporting Clube de Goa on 25 April 2004.

=== Vietnam ===
In early 2005, Patron signed for Khatoco Khanh Hoa of the Vietnamese First Division, the second tier of Vietnamese football. The team finished in first place and won promotion to the V.League 1.

== Coaching career ==
Patron joined WAFA around 2014 and was promoted to head coach in 2016. He then made way and was assistant to Klavs Rasmussen, and the pair steered WAFA to a second place finish in the 2017 Ghana Premier League.

At the season's end, Patron was snapped up by former club Asante Kotoko at the recommendation of Steven Polack, who made him his assistant. However, in the following February Asante Kotoko were eliminated at the qualifying stage of the 2018 CAF Confederation Cup by CARA Brazzaville, which cost Polack his job. He nevertheless continued his deputy role behind Paa Kwesi Fabin and afterwards C.K. Akonnor, before leaving in 2019.

In March 2022, Patron was appointed head coach of Cheetah F.C. of Kasoa, Ghana. He then coached Kotoku Royals at the 2022–23 Ghana Premier League where they finished rock bottom, in which he moved on to taking the reins of Victory Club Warriors the following year.

In July 2025, Patron was signed as assistant coach of Division One League Golden Warriors under Andy Sinason. The pair were relieved of their posts by the club in November.

== Honours ==
=== Team ===
Asante Kotoko

- Ghana Premier League (2): 1991–92, 1992–93

Brunei

- Malaysia Cup: 1999

Mahindra United

- POMIS Cup: 2003
- Indian Federation Cup: 2003, 2005
- Indian Super Cup: 2003

Khanh Hoa

- First Division Football League: 2005

=== Individual ===
- Meritorious Service Medal (PJK; 1999)
