= List of Indian football transfers winter 2012–13 =

This is a list of Indian football transfers in the winter transfer window 2012–13 by club.

== I-League ==
=== Air India ===
In: Note: Flags indicate national team as defined under FIFA eligibility rules; some limited exceptions apply. Players may hold more than one non-FIFA nationality.

No.	Pos.	Nation	Player
—	FW	IND	Sandesh Gadkari (Free Agent)

Out: Note: Flags indicate national team as defined under FIFA eligibility rules; some limited exceptions apply. Players may hold more than one non-FIFA nationality.

No.	Pos.	Nation	Player

=== Churchill Brothers ===
In: Note: Flags indicate national team as defined under FIFA eligibility rules; some limited exceptions apply. Players may hold more than one non-FIFA nationality.

No.	Pos.	Nation	Player

Out: Note: Flags indicate national team as defined under FIFA eligibility rules; some limited exceptions apply. Players may hold more than one non-FIFA nationality.

No.	Pos.	Nation	Player
—	DF	LBN	Bilal Najjarine (to (United Arab Emirates) Fujairah)

=== Dempo ===
In: Note: Flags indicate national team as defined under FIFA eligibility rules; some limited exceptions apply. Players may hold more than one non-FIFA nationality.

No.	Pos.	Nation	Player
—	MF	LBR	Johnny Menyongar (on loan from Shillong Lajong)

Out: Note: Flags indicate national team as defined under FIFA eligibility rules; some limited exceptions apply. Players may hold more than one non-FIFA nationality.

No.	Pos.	Nation	Player
—	DF	GHA	Stephen Ofei (released)
—	MF	ENG	Rohan Ricketts (to (Colombia) Club Deportivo Quevedo)

=== East Bengal ===
In: Note: Flags indicate national team as defined under FIFA eligibility rules; some limited exceptions apply. Players may hold more than one non-FIFA nationality.

No.	Pos.	Nation	Player
—	FW	AUS	Andrew Barisic (from (Indonesia) Arema FC)

Out: Note: Flags indicate national team as defined under FIFA eligibility rules; some limited exceptions apply. Players may hold more than one non-FIFA nationality.

No.	Pos.	Nation	Player
—	FW	IND	Seminlen Doungel (on loan to Pailan Arrows)
—	MF	IND	Sushanth Mathew (to Mohun Bagan)

=== Mohun Bagan ===
In: Note: Flags indicate national team as defined under FIFA eligibility rules; some limited exceptions apply. Players may hold more than one non-FIFA nationality.

No.	Pos.	Nation	Player
—	MF	NAM	Quinton Jacobs (Free Agent)
—	MF	IND	Sushanth Mathew (from East Bengal)

Out: Note: Flags indicate national team as defined under FIFA eligibility rules; some limited exceptions apply. Players may hold more than one non-FIFA nationality.

No.	Pos.	Nation	Player
—	MF	NGA	Stanley Okoroigwe (Released)

=== Mumbai ===
In: Note: Flags indicate national team as defined under FIFA eligibility rules; some limited exceptions apply. Players may hold more than one non-FIFA nationality.

No.	Pos.	Nation	Player
—	MF	IND	Chhangte Malsawmkima (Free Agent)

Out: Note: Flags indicate national team as defined under FIFA eligibility rules; some limited exceptions apply. Players may hold more than one non-FIFA nationality.

No.	Pos.	Nation	Player

=== Pailan Arrows ===
In: Note: Flags indicate national team as defined under FIFA eligibility rules; some limited exceptions apply. Players may hold more than one non-FIFA nationality.

No.	Pos.	Nation	Player
—	FW	IND	Seminlen Doungel (on loan from East Bengal)

Out: Note: Flags indicate national team as defined under FIFA eligibility rules; some limited exceptions apply. Players may hold more than one non-FIFA nationality.

No.	Pos.	Nation	Player

=== Salgaocar ===
In: Note: Flags indicate national team as defined under FIFA eligibility rules; some limited exceptions apply. Players may hold more than one non-FIFA nationality.

No.	Pos.	Nation	Player
—	FW	BRA	Josimar (Free Agent)
—	MF	SGP	John Wilkinson (from (Singapore) Home United)
—	FW	NGA	O. J. Obatola (from (Georgia (country)) Dinamo Tbilisi)

Out: Note: Flags indicate national team as defined under FIFA eligibility rules; some limited exceptions apply. Players may hold more than one non-FIFA nationality.

No.	Pos.	Nation	Player
—	DF	IND	Karan Atwal (Released)
—	MF	IND	Chhangte Malsawmkima (Released)
—	FW	IND	Sandesh Gadkari (Released)
—	FW	IND	Bijoy Basfore (Released)
—	FW	AUS	Sean Rooney (Released)
—	FW	PHI	Ángel Guirado (Released)
—	MF	NAM	Quinton Jacobs (Released)

=== Shillong Lajong ===
In: Note: Flags indicate national team as defined under FIFA eligibility rules; some limited exceptions apply. Players may hold more than one non-FIFA nationality.

No.	Pos.	Nation	Player
—	FW	POR	Edinho Junior (on loan from Blackburn Rovers)

Out: Note: Flags indicate national team as defined under FIFA eligibility rules; some limited exceptions apply. Players may hold more than one non-FIFA nationality.

No.	Pos.	Nation	Player
—	MF	LBR	Johnny Menyongar (on loan to Dempo)

=== Sporting Goa ===
In: Note: Flags indicate national team as defined under FIFA eligibility rules; some limited exceptions apply. Players may hold more than one non-FIFA nationality.

No.	Pos.	Nation	Player

Out: Note: Flags indicate national team as defined under FIFA eligibility rules; some limited exceptions apply. Players may hold more than one non-FIFA nationality.

No.	Pos.	Nation	Player
—	MF	NGA	Anoure Obiora (Released)

=== United Sikkim ===
In: Note: Flags indicate national team as defined under FIFA eligibility rules; some limited exceptions apply. Players may hold more than one non-FIFA nationality.

No.	Pos.	Nation	Player
—	MF	USA	John Matkin (Free Agent)

Out: Note: Flags indicate national team as defined under FIFA eligibility rules; some limited exceptions apply. Players may hold more than one non-FIFA nationality.

No.	Pos.	Nation	Player
—	MF	TOG	Dosseh Attivi (Released)
—	GK	KOR	Yoon Tae (Mutual Choice)
