= Narendra Man Singh =

Nepalese footballer (1958–2009)

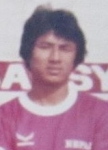

Personal information
- Date of birth: 1958
- Place of birth: Kathmandu, Nepal
- Date of death: 27 November 2009 (aged 50–51)
- Position: Forward

Senior career*
Years	Team	Apps	(Gls)
1974	Ranipokhari Corner		
1975-1982	Sankata Boys SC		
1982-1986	Mafatlal Mills Bombay		
1982-1990	Mahindra & Mahindra Bombay		
1990-2000	Sankata Boys SC		

International career
1982	Nepal	4	(0)
- * Club domestic league appearances and goals

Narendra Man Singh (Nepali: नरेन्द्र मान सिंह; 1958 – 27 November 2009) was a Nepalese footballer. A forward, was the first Nepali player to play professional football in India, and played for the Nepal national team in the 1982 Asian Games. He played nearly eight years for the two Indian sides Mafatlal Group and Mahindra United.

== Biography ==
=== Early life and education ===
Narendra Man Singh was born in Kathmandu, Nepal. He was the son of Dwarika Man Singh and had six siblings. The eldest sibling, Surrendra Man Singh, and the youngest male sibling, Yogendra Man Singh, both died at young ages. Narendra Man Singh and his younger sibling, Birendra Man Singh, represented Nepal in international football.

=== Career ===
Singh started playing in domestic tournaments as early as 1971, and became one of the top Nepali strikers of his time. He was the first footballer from Nepal to play professionally in India, where he spent 8 years of his career. One of the highlights of his playing days came in 1981 when, representing Nepal at the 23rd Asian Youth Football tournament, he scored 2 goals in a 4-2 win over India. He represented the senior national team the following year.

=== Marriage and children ===
Singh was married and had a son.

=== Death and afterward ===
He died of jaundice on 27 November 2009.
