= Monwar Hossain Munna =

Bangladeshi footballer

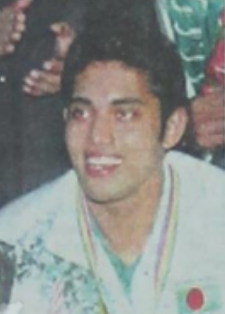
- Munna pictured at the 1999 SA Games

Personal information
- Full name: Md Monwar Hossain Munna
- Date of birth: 1 October 1977 (age 49)
- Place of birth: Dhaka, Bangladesh
- Height: 1.83 m (6 ft 0 in)
- Position: Center-back

Senior career*
Years	Team	Apps	(Gls)
1993–1994	East End		
1995–2000	Mohammedan		
1998	Mahindra United		
2001	Badda Jagoroni		
2002–2003	Muktijoddha		

International career
1995–1999	Bangladesh		
Medal record
Representing Bangladesh
Men's football
South Asian Games
Gold medal – first place	1999 Kathmandu
- * Club domestic league appearances and goals

Monwar Hossain Munna (Bengali: মনোয়ার হোসেন মুন্না; born 1 October 1977). alternatively spelled Manowar Hossain Munna, is a retired Bangladeshi footballer. He represented the Bangladesh national team from 1995 to 1999.

== Club career ==
Munna began his career in the Dhaka First Division League with East End Club in 1993. He helped the club gain promotion to the Premier Division within two seasons and eventually joined Mohammedan SC in 1995. He also had a stint with Indian club Mahindra United, where he won the prestigious Durand Cup trophy, defeating East Bengal in the final.

== International career ==
In 1995, German coach Otto Pfister included Munna in the squad for the 4-nation Tiger Trophy in Myanmar. On 26 October 1995, he made his debut against hosts Myanmar in the first round-robin game where Bangladesh were defeated 0–4. During the game, he was substituted by Sohel Reza and did not appear again in the tournament. Under the captaincy of Monem Munna, Bangladesh eventually went on to win their first international trophy by defeating the hosts 2–1 in the final. He was also part of the national team that won its first gold medal, at the 1999 South Asian Games in Kathmandu, Nepal.

== Personal life ==
In 2017, Munna received an award from Mohammedan SC supporter group Mohapagol and club officials for his contribution to the club.

On 11 August 2022, it was reported that the Capital Development Authority (RAJUK) raided Munna's house in Malibagh, Pabna Colony. The organization claimed that the land was illegally occupied by the footballer.

== Honours ==
East End Club

- Dhaka First Division League: 1995

Mohammedan SC

- Dhaka Premier Division League: 1996, 1999

Mahindra United

- Durand Cup: 1998

Bangladesh

- 4-nation Tiger Trophy: 1995
- South Asian Games Gold medal: 1999
