= Charles Asamoah =

Ghanaian footballer

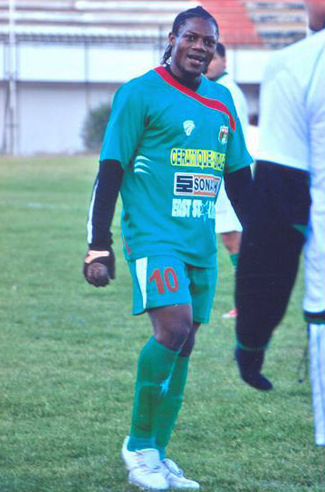

Personal information
- Full name: Prince Charles Kofi Asamoah
- Date of birth: 1 July 1985 (age 41)
- Place of birth: Accra, Ghana
- Height: 5 ft 11 in (1.80 m)
- Position: Striker

Team information
- Current team: ASFA Yennega

Youth career
- from 1997–2000: Soccer Millionaires

Senior career*
Years	Team	Apps	(Gls)
2000–2003	Asante Kotoko	36 matches	(17)
2003–2004	Sekondi Hasacas	21	(11)
2004–2005	Mahindra United	25	(14)
2005–2006	Sharks	30	(10)
2006–2007	Bahrain Club	28	(14)
2007–2008	Sharks	25	(8)
2008–2010	Sharks	28	(12)
2011–2013	Desert Warriors	48	(32)
2013–2014	ASFA Yennega	8	(4)
2014–2015	ASFA Yennega	41	(29)
- * Club domestic league appearances and goals as of August 18m 2011

Prince Charles Kofi Asamoah (also known as Charles Asamoah; born 1 July 1985) is a retired Ghanaian professional footballer. Asamoah began his career playing for Kumasi Asante Kotoko in his home country.

== Career ==
=== Professional ===
Charles Asamoah played for Kumasi Asante Kotoko in his home country before joining Mahindra United in 2004. Charles Asamoah as he is popularly known spent three seasons with the premier league giants Kumasi Asante Kotoko (Porcupine Warriors) appearing in over 36 matches and scoring more goals for the club.

He won the Best Striker and the Most Featured Player Award for Kumasi Asante Kotoko in 2001 premier league season.

Charles Asamoah moved to Mahindra United in India in 2004 and spent two seasons at the club appearing in over 25 matches scoring most of the club's most important goals of the season and emerging as the Second Best Player in the Indian Major League. He was also acknowledge in the history of the India League as the only player to open his career with assists in each of his first three home games.

=== International ===
Charles Asamoah began his international career with the German second division club Antatriya in 2002 after the British coach David Booth recruited him. He also played for the Ghana National Under 23 (Black Meteors) in 2001.

A brother to Ghanaian born German international footballer, Gerard Asamoah, the first black to feature for the Germany national team before David Odonkor who played for Borussia Dortmund and Real Betis and Jerome Boateng who now plays for Bayern Munich after a good season with Manchester City in England.

Asamoah joined Mahindra United in India in 2004 after turning down a lucrative offer from Raja Casablanca, a leading Morocco club. He featured in most matches for the Indian Club and played a major role in the 2004–2006 seasons of the India Premier League and won the hearts of many of the club's supporters including football lovers in India.

In his first game for Mahindra United in 2004, he scored and assisted in the game which ended in favour of Mahindra United.

After two seasons with Mahindra United he joined the Sharks of Portharcourt in Nigeria. He also went on loan at Bahrain Sports Club {Naide Bahrain} in the Persian Gulf region.

== Honours ==
Mahindra United

- Indian Federation Cup: 2005
