= 1987 POMIS Cup =

POMIS Cup
Tournament details
- Teams: 5

Final positions
- Champions: Renown Sports Club
- Runners-up: Saunders SC

The 1987 POMIS Cup is the first championship, starting group matches on 9 January 1987 onwards at Rasmee Dhandu Stadium, Malé, Maldives.

== Teams ==
The top three teams of 1986 Dhivehi League and two invited foreign clubs.

=== Teams and Nation ===
Note: Table lists clubs in alphabetical order.

Team	Nation
Club Valencia	Maldives
New Radiant SC	Maldives
Renown Sports Club	Sri Lanka
Saunders SC	Sri Lanka
Victory Sports Club	Maldives

=== Final ===
Renown Sports Club	0–0 (3–1 p)	Saunders SC	Rasmee Dhandu Stadium, Malé
