= Filipe Azevedo =

Portuguese footballer (born 1975)

Personal information
- Full name: Filipe Vaz de Azevedo
- Date of birth: 21 January 1975 (age 51)
- Place of birth: Valence, France
- Height: 1.83 m (6 ft 0 in)
- Position: Forward

Youth career
- Bourg Saint Andéol
- 1986–1987: Orange
- 1987–1994: Marseille

Senior career*
Years	Team	Apps	(Gls)
1994–1995	Marseille B		
1995–1998	Felgueiras	68	(16)
1998–2000	Alverca	44	(7)
2000	Lokomotiv Moscow	4	(0)
2000–2001	Campomaiorense	13	(3)
2001–2002	Penafiel	23	(2)
2002	Sedan	0	(0)
2003	Salgueiros	12	(2)
2004–2005	Felgueiras	15	(5)
2005–2006	Olhanense	31	(2)
2006–2007	Mahindra United		
2007	Ourense	11	(1)
2008	AEL Limassol	10	(0)
2008–2010	Cerro Reyes		
Total		231	(38)
- * Club domestic league appearances and goals

Filipe Vaz de Azevedo (born 21 January 1975) is a French retired footballer who played as a forward.
