= 1988 POMIS Cup =

POMIS Cup
Tournament details
- Teams: 6

Final positions
- Champions: Sri Lanka York SC
- Runners-up: Maldives New Radiant SC

The 1988 POMIS Cup is the second championship, played at Rasmee Dhandu Stadium, Malé, Maldives.

== Teams ==
The top four teams of 1987 Dhivehi League and two invited foreign clubs.

=== Teams and Nation ===
Note: Table lists clubs in alphabetical order.

- Maldives Club Lagoons
- Maldives Club Valencia
- Maldives New Radiant SC
- Sri Lanka Renown Sports Club
- Maldives Victory Sports Club
- Sri Lanka York SC

=== Groups ===
Group A

- Sri Lanka York SC (Group Winners)
- Sri Lanka Renown Sports Club
- Maldives Victory Sports Club

Group B

- Maldives New Radiant SC (Group Winners)
- Maldives Club Valencia
- Maldives Club Lagoons

=== Final ===
| York SC | 1–1 (4–2 p) | New Radiant SC | Rasmee Dhandu Stadium, Malé |
