= Srećko Mitrović =

Australian soccer player (born 1984)

Personal information
- Date of birth: 17 February 1984 (age 42)
- Place of birth: Zenica, SFR Yugoslavia
- Height: 1.80 m (5 ft 11 in)
- Position: Midfielder

Youth career
- 2000−2001: Marconi Stallions
- 2001−2002: Piacenza
- 2002−2003: Ascoli

Senior career*
Years	Team	Apps	(Gls)
2003−2005	Ascoli	18	(0)
2005	→ Morro d'Oro (loan)	14	(0)
2006−2008	Poli Iaşi	38	(1)
2009	Sutherland Sharks	12	(1)
2009−2010	East Bengal	13	(4)
2010−2012	PSM Makassar	32	(6)
2012−2013	Deltras	28	(4)
2014	Sabah	16	(2)
2015	Tampines Rovers	0	(0)
2017	Cement Beočin	5	(2)
2018	Radnički Sremska Mitrovica	6	(0)
2019	Geelong SC	9	(1)
Total		191	(21)
- * Club domestic league appearances and goals

Srećko Mitrović (born 17 February 1984) is an Australian former professional soccer player who played as a midfielder.

== Career ==
Born in Zenica, SR Bosnia and Herzegovina, when part of Yugoslavia, Srećko Mitrović started his playing career at Marconi Stallions in 2000, at the age of 16. In 2001, while he was only 17, Mitrović was bought by the Italian Serie A club Piacenza. In 2002, he signed a five-year deal with Italian Serie B club Ascoli. After three years playing for Ascoli. he was shortly on loan in Morro d'Oro in Serie C.

In 2006 Mitrović moved to Romanian Liga I by signing a contract with Poli Iaşi.

In 2009, he went back to Australia, and for six months he was playing for Sutherland Sharks, before he moved to East Bengal in the Indian I-League. In October 2010 Mitrović signed a contract with Indonesian team PSM Makassar, he moved to Deltras in 2012.

In the summer of 2017, he returned to Europe and signed with Serbian third-tier side FK Cement Beočin.

In 2019, Mitrović returned to Australia, signing for Victorian club Geelong SC in the National Premier Leagues Victoria 2.

== Honours ==
Sutherland Sharks

- NSW Premier League: 2009
