= Chhangte Malsawmkima =

Indian footballer

Personal information
- Date of birth: 10 September 1991 (age 35)
- Place of birth: Mizoram, India
- Position: Midfielder

Team information
- Current team: Fateh Hyderabad A.F.C.
- Number: 28

Youth career
- 2008–2010: TFA

Senior career*
Years	Team	Apps	(Gls)
2010–2011	Mumbai	11	(0)
2012	Salgaocar	0	(0)
2013	Mumbai	1	(0)
2013–2014	Mumbai Tigers	10	(0)
2014	Tollygunge Agragami F.C.	9	(0)
2015	Chanmari F.C.	1	(0)
2016	FC Zalen	12	(1)
2017–	Fateh Hyderabad A.F.C.	2	(0)
- * Club domestic league appearances and goals

Chhangte Malsawmkima (born 10 September 1991) is an Indian footballer who plays as a midfielder for Fateh Hyderabad A.F.C. in the I-League 2nd Division.

== Career ==
=== Mumbai ===
The 2011-12 football year got off to a good start for Malsawmkima as he made his debut for Mumbai F.C. in the 2011 Indian Federation Cup against Salgaocar. He then made his league debut for Mumbai against East Bengal on 2 November 2011.

=== Salgaocar ===
On 9 June 2012 it was confirmed that Malsawmkima signed for Salgaocar F.C. who also play in the I-League. However, on 8 December 2012 after not playing any games for Salgaocar in the I-League Malsawmkima was released from the club.

=== Mumbai (2nd term) ===
After being released from Salgaocar Malsawmkima re-signed with his former club Mumbai F.C. for which he made his second debut with the club on 24 January 2013 against Churchill Brothers S.C. in an I-League match at the Balewadi Sports Complex in which he played the full 90 as Mumbai drew the match 0–0.

== Career statistics ==
=== Club ===
Statistics accurate as of 1 February 2013

Club	Season	League		Federation Cup		Durand Cup		AFC		Total	
Club	Season	Apps	Goals	Apps	Goals	Apps	Goals	Apps	Goals	Apps	Goals
Mumbai	2011–12	11	0	2	0	0	0	—	—	13	0
Mumbai	2012–13	1	0	0	0	0	0	—	—	1	0
Career total		12	0	2	0	0	0	0	0	14	0
