= Mahindra United FC =

Indian association football club disbanded in 2011

Mahindra United
- Full name: Mahindra United Football Club
- Nickname: Jeepmen
- Short name: MUFC
- Founded: 1962; 64 years ago (as Mahindra & Mahindra)
- Dissolved: 2010; 16 years ago
- Ground: Cooperage Ground, Mumbai
- Capacity: 5,000
- Owner: Mahindra Group
- League: I-League; MDFA Senior Division
Home colours	Away colours

Mahindra United Football Club (formerly known as Mahindra & Mahindra) was an Indian professional football club based in Mumbai, Maharashtra. Founded in 1962, the club competed in the I-League, then the top tier of the Indian football league system, before closing down at the end of 2009–10 season. Affiliated with Mumbai Football Association, the club participated in both the National Football League, and MDFA Elite League.

Nicknamed "Jeepmen", the club was popularly referred as India's MU after the English Premier League powerhouse Manchester United. It was one of the most popular football clubs in the country and was known for its consistent good performance in the last four decades of its existence. The club had won many major tournaments in India, and also clinched an international tournament, 2003 POMIS Cup in the Maldives.

== History ==
=== Formation and journey ===
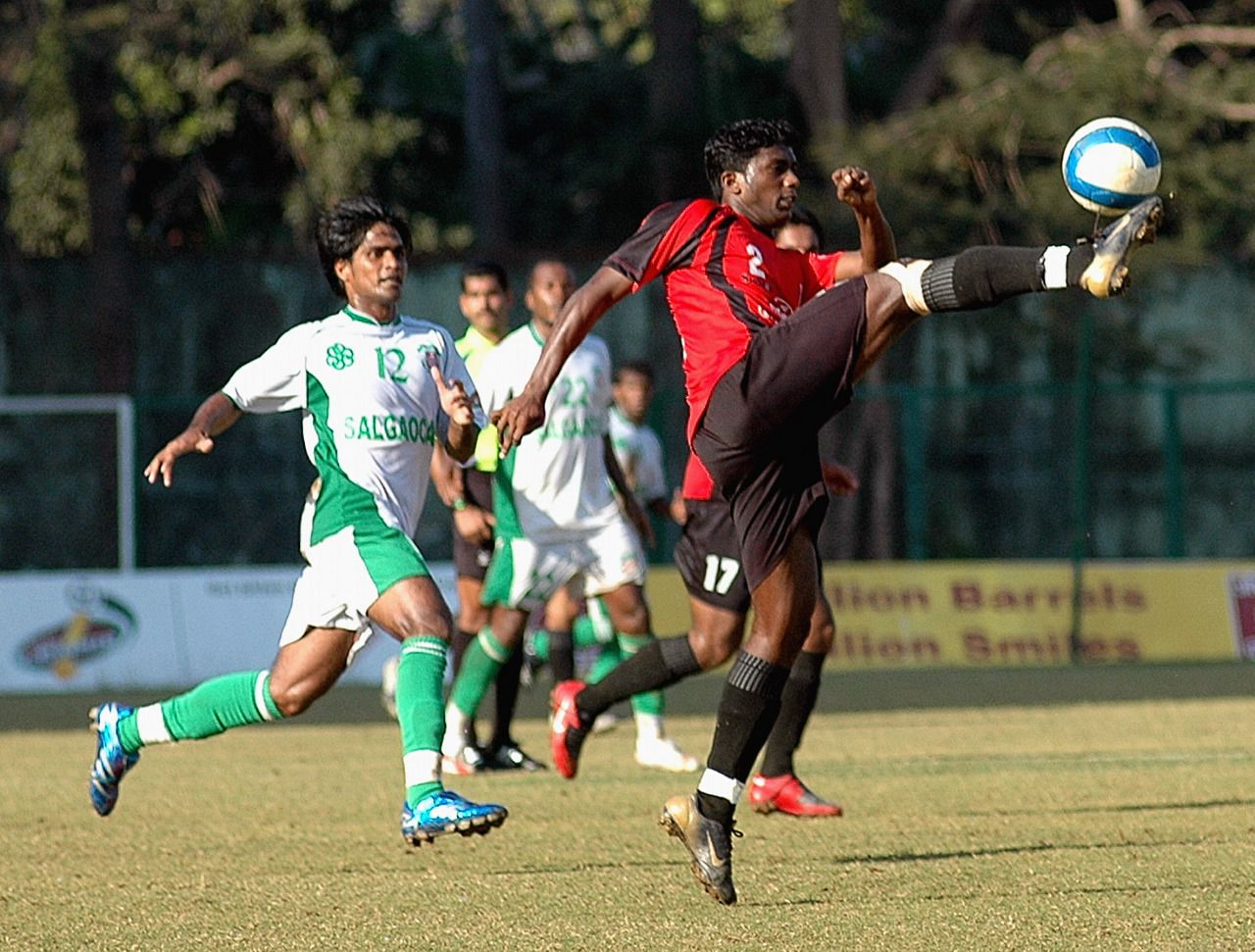
Mahindra United players (in red) in action during an I-League match against Salgaocar in 2007

The club was founded in 1962 as the "Mahindra & Mahindra Allied Sports Club" under the patronage of Mahindra Group. They secured admission into Bombay's Harwood League in 1964 and won their first title in 1970. Players like renowned goalkeeper E.N. Sudhir appeared with the club at that time. The club later lifted its first knock-out tournament, Bandodkar Gold Trophy in 1980. The club later became Durand Cup champion in 1998, under coaching of legendary football manager Syed Shahid Hakim, and went on to clinch the title again in 2001–02.

==== In leagues of Mumbai ====
Since their inception, Mahindra became a member of Western India Football Association (WIFA) and later in 1983, became affiliated with Mumbai District Football Association (formerly BDFA). They participated in later editions of Bombay Harwood League alongside Maharashtra Football League, and won the Harwood League four times in 1970, 1982, 1984 and 1985.

Mahindra later participated in W.I.F.A. Super Division from 1990 to 1999 and clinched WIFA title in 1995.

They later participated in MDFA Elite Division and lifted trophies consecutively from 2000 to 2004 and 2006 to 2009.

=== NFL and other domestic competitions ===
From 2002 to 2003, Czech coach Karel Stromšík managed the club in the National Football League. In the summer of 2006, it was renamed Mahindra United. The shirt colour was also changed from orange to red.

The team played its NFL home matches at the Cooperage Ground in Mumbai, but due to the bad state of the stadium, as of February 7, 2006, they had to play almost all of their NFL games at away venues.

Mahindra were crowned champions of NFL Premier Division for the first time in the club's history in the 2005–06 season, with two games to spare. They followed it up by beating their arch-rivals, Air India for the first time in the season. They are also two-time winners of the Indian Federation Cup, having won the title in 2003 and 2005. The win in 2005 ensured that Mahindra became the first club in the history of Indian football to win both the Federation Cup and National Football League in the same season. They did however lose the NFL Super Cup to East Bengal by a margin of 1–2.

=== Later years ===
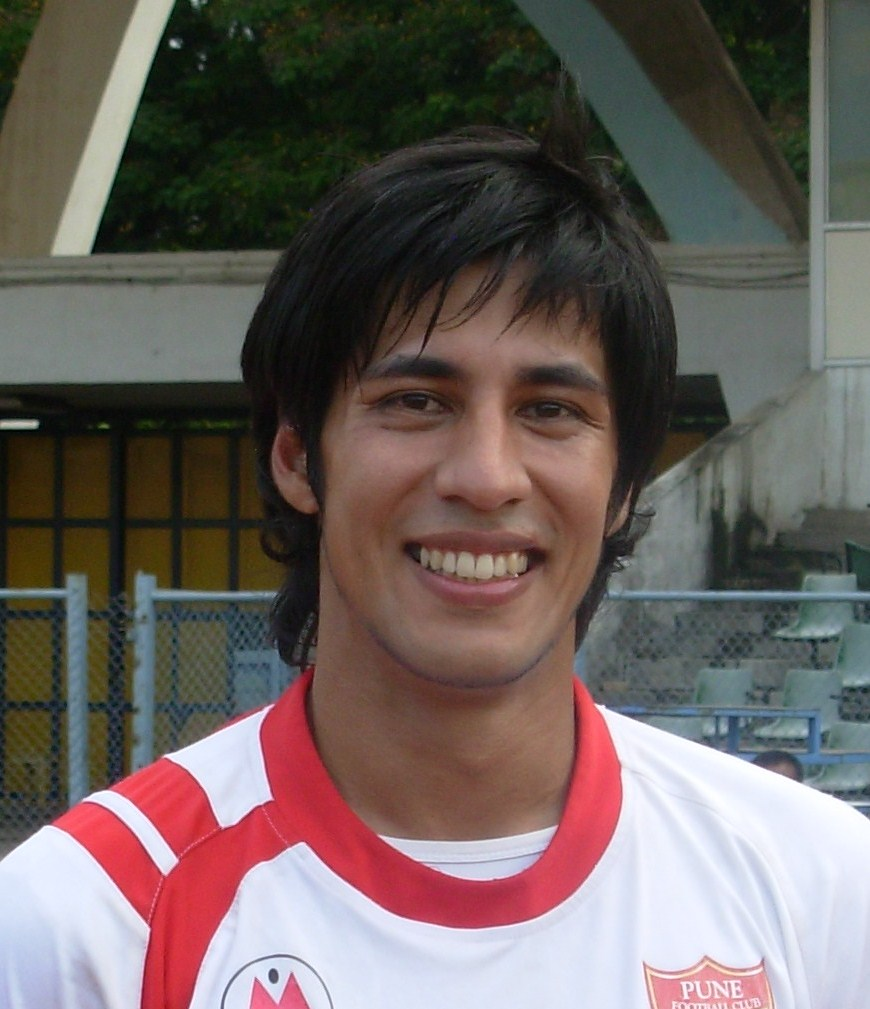
Arata Izumi is the first ever naturalized Indian footballer, who played for both Mahindra United and the India national team.

In the 2006 edition of IFA Shield, Mahindra United emerged as champions, defeating Mohun Bagan AC by 1–0 in Kolkata. They also participated in the 2006 Federation Cup and achieved third place, defeating Dempo SC 4–2 in the penalty-shootout. In the 2008 edition of IFA Shield, they defeated the South African side Santos FC by 3–1 to win the title.

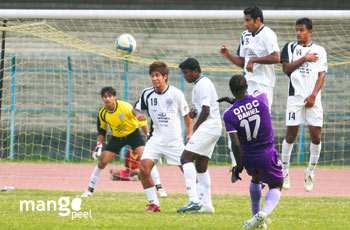
Mahindra United players blocking a freekick in an I-League match against ONGC.

Head coach of the team was Derrick Pereira. Players like Subhashish Roy Chowdhury, Manjit Singh and Surojit Bose have been associated with the team. The club also tried forming under-15 and under-19 teams in order to nurture the young talent in the country.

== Stadium ==
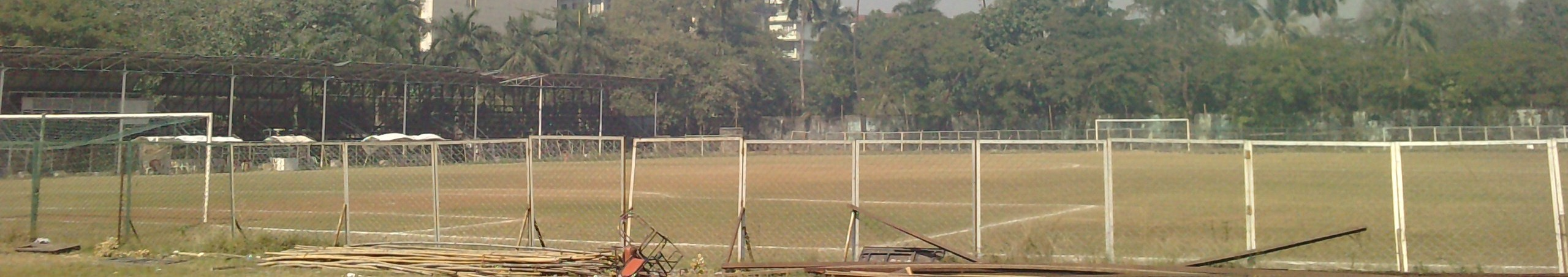
Cooperage Football Ground before renovation

Mahindra United mainly used Cooperage Football Ground. It is located in Nariman Point, Mumbai, The stadium hosted home matches of both the National Football League and I-League, alongside MDFA Elite League; It had a seating capacity of nearly 12,000 spectators.

== Rivalry ==
During their existence and playing days, Mahindra United shared rivalry in the NFL, predominantly with fellow Mumbai-based club Air India.

== Disbanding the club ==
In 2010, it was announced that the club will be disbanded after the end of the 2009–10 I-League. The decision was a major blow for football in Mumbai, and financial reasons were one of the main factors behind it. Alan Durante, the chairman of Mahindra United, who had been with the team since 1991 and under whom Mahindra have won almost everything in Indian football, said it wasn't about costs.

We have decided to get out of competitive football and get into it at the school level. From the end of the I-League (2009–10 season), we will not take part in any competitive football. The players have promised to give their best in our remaining three I-League matches. We will then try to defend our title in the MDFA Elite Division, before closing down. Nobody in Indian football makes money and had that been the reason, we would have shut shop five years ago.

— Alan Durante, chairman of Mahindra United FC, after taking the decision of disbanding the club

Ruzbeh Irani, executive vice-president of the club, said: "It was in line with our group's philosophy and shift, from taking part in professional sport to developing it. We feel we can make much difference to sport in India at the school level in football, instead of running a professional team." Due to the dysfunction of Mahindra United, the All India Football Federation allowed AIFF XI to take part in I-League directly.

== Achievements ==
=== Overall ===
Mahindra United had won almost all the major competitions in India until its dissolution. The club was one-time winner of the National Football League. It was also the first team from Maharashtra to win the Harwood League and Nadkarni Cup three times in a row, and also first team from the state to compete in domestic highest division. The club has also been two-time winner of IFA Shield and Federation Cup. There are several other championships like Mammen Mappillai Cup, Rovers Cup, Chief Minister's Cup and Super Cup where Mahindra United has registered victories.

On an international level, Mahindra United achieved success through lifting the 2003 POMIS Cup trophy in the Maldives, beating Club Valencia 3–1. They also became the first Indian club to reach the quarter-finals of the 2007 AFC Cup, but their journey ended with an aggregate 4–5 defeat to Lebanese side Al-Najmeh SC. In 2003, Debjit Ghosh of Mahindra United, won the IndianFootball.com 'player of the Year' award.

=== Ranking ===
Mahindra United emerged as the top ranked Indian team, and 464th universally, in the international rankings of clubs during the first ten years of the 21st century (2001–2010), issued by the International Federation of Football History & Statistics in 2011.

=== Individual ===
In three consecutive seasons, Indian players (while representing Mahindra United) have been awarded the AIFF Player of the Year: S Venkatesh in 2004, Climax Lawrence in 2005, and Surkumar Singh in 2006.

== Honours ==
=== Invitational ===
- (Maldives) POMIS Cup (Note: The POMIS Cup (President of Maldives Invitational Soccer Cup), an international club football tournament incorporated in 1987, is the only international club tournament held in the Maldives, organized by the Football Association of Maldives (FAM).)
  - Champions (1): 2003

=== Continental ===
- AFC Cup
  - Quarter-final (1): 2007

=== Domestic ===
- National Football League
  - Champions (1): 2005–06
  - Third place (2): 2003–04, 2006–07
- Durand Cup
  - Champions (3): 1998, 2001–02, 2008
  - Runners-up (3): 1990, 2000, 2007
- Federation Cup
  - Champions (2): 2003, 2005
  - Runners-up (3): 1991, 1993, 2007
- Indian Super Cup
  - Champions (1): 2003
  - Runners-up (1): 2006
- IFA Shield (Note: Fourth oldest football tournament, organized by the IFA (W.B.), and played between the local clubs of West Bengal and other invited ones.)
  - Champions (2): 2006, 2008
- Rovers Cup
  - Champions (1): 1993
  - Runners-up (2): 1970–71, 1990
- Mumbai Harwood League (MDFA Elite Division)
  - Champions (13): 1970, 1982, 1984, 1985, 1995, 2000, 2001, 2002, 2003, 2004, 2006–07, 2007–08, 2008–09
- Nadkarni Cup
  - Champions (3): 1986, 2001, 2002
  - Runners-up (4): 1968, 1971, 1974, 2005
- Mammen Mappillai Trophy
  - Champions (1): 1999
- Bandodkar Gold Trophy
  - Champions (1): 1980
  - Runners-up (1): 1988
- Sait Nagjee Trophy
  - Runners-up (1): 1975

=== Others ===
- Chief Ministers Cup
  - Champions (1): 1998

== Performance in AFC competitions ==
- AFC Cup: 3 appearances

2004: Group stage
2006: Group stage
2007: Quarter-finals

=== Continental record ===
Season	Competition	Round	Country	Club	Home	Away
2004	AFC Cup	Group stage	(Oman)	Dhofar	2–1	2–4
2004	AFC Cup	Group stage	(Syria)	Al-Wahda	0–0	1–5
2006	AFC Cup	Group stage	(Lebanon)	Al Ahed	2–1	2–2
2006	AFC Cup	Group stage	(Bangladesh)	Brothers Union	1–0	2–2
2006	AFC Cup	Group stage	(Bahrain)	Al-Muharraq	0–1	1–1
2007	AFC Cup	Group stage	(Singapore)	Singapore Armed Forces	0–1	2–0
2007	AFC Cup	Group stage	(Maldives)	New Radiant	1–0	2–0
2007	AFC Cup	Group stage	(Hong Kong)	Happy Valley AA	3–1	1–2
2007	AFC Cup	Quarter-final	(Lebanon)	Al-Najmeh	1–2	3–3

== Notable players ==
For all former or notable Mahindra United players with a Wikipedia article, see: Mahindra United FC players.

=== Foreign players ===
The following players of Mahindra United either represented their respective countries in senior/youth international level or appeared with the club in top-tier domestic league of India.

- (Nepal) Narendra Man Singh (1986–1989)
- (Bangladesh) Monwar Hossain Munna (1997–1998)
- (Jordan) Sameer Jameel (1999–2000)
- (Jordan) Bassam Al-Khatib (1999–2000)
- (Iran) Davood Hosseini (2000–2001)
- (Nepal) Hari Khadka (2001)
- (Brazil) (Ukraine) Gilmar Tadeu da Silva (2001–2002)
- (Nepal) Bal Gopal Maharjan (2001–2002)
- (Uzbekistan) Sergey Andreyev (2001–2002)
- (Czech Republic) Štrandel Petr (2002–2003)
- (Ghana) Odartey Lawson (2002–2004)
- (Ghana) Felix Aboagye (2003–2004)
- (Togo) Raphaël Patron Akakpo (2003–2005)
- (Ghana) Charles Asamoah (2004–2005)
- (Brazil) José Ramirez Barreto (2005–2006)
- (Ghana) Yusif Yakubu (2005–2008)
- (South Africa) Mbaka Dady (2006–2007)
- (Canada) Tony Menezes (2006–2007)
- (France) Filipe Azevedo (2006–2007)
- (Ghana) Andrews Pomeyie Mensah (2006–2008)
- (Saint Vincent and the Grenadines) Caswain Mason (2007)
- (Republic of the Congo) Edson Dico Minga (2007)
- (Ivory Coast) Douhou Pierre (2007–2009)
- (Senegal) Lamine Tamba (2007–2010)
- (Nigeria) Bello Razaq (2008)
- (Serbia) Svetozar Mijin (2009)

== Personnel history ==
=== Final staff ===
Role	Name
Head coach	(England) David Booth
Assistant coach	(India) Arshad Hussain
Team manager	(India) Henry Menezes
Physio	(India) Sandeep Kurale
Medical head	(India) N. N. Shingornikar

== Youth teams ==
=== Mahindra United under-19 ===
In an attempt to nurture young talent and promote football in Mumbai, Mahindra United fielded an under-19 team from 2003. The team was managed by Santosh Kashyap, and performed extremely well in the National Football League (Under-19) and reached the semi-finals, beating teams like Churchill Brothers and Salgaocar.

Mahindra United participated in U19 I-League, held since 2008.

=== Under-15 and 17 ===
Spurred by the success of its U-19 team, Mahindra United fielded both U-15 and U-17 teams from 2006. The U-15 team played Manchester United Premier Cup Asian Qualifiers held at Kolkata, where top NFL clubs also participated.

Youth setup has also participated in the Manchester United Premier Cup in 2010.

Honours

- Manchester United Premier Cup: India
  - Runners-up (2): 2006–07, 2007–08

== Managerial history ==
Note: The following list may not be complete

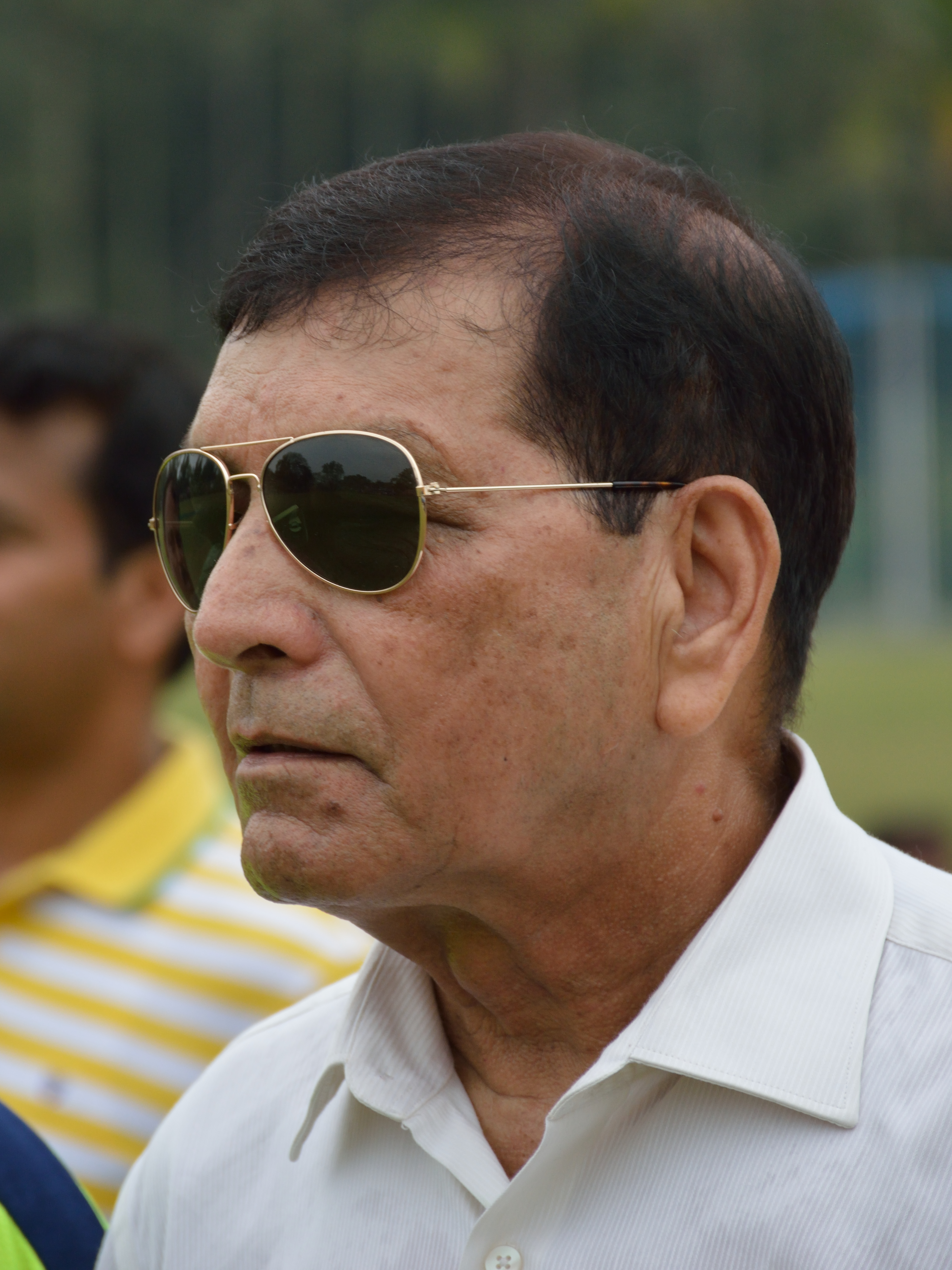
Dronacharya coach Syed Nayeemuddin was manager of Mahindra United from 2004 to 2005.

- (India) Dereyk D'Souza (1981–1982)
- (India) Syed Shahid Hakim (1998–1999)
- (India) Harish Rao (1999–2000), (2001–2002)
- (India) Shabbir Ali (2000–2001)
- (Czech Republic) Karel Stromšík (2002–2003)
- (England) Dave Booth (2003–2004), (2009–2010)
- (India) Syed Nayeemuddin (2004–2005)
- (India) Derrick Pereira (2005–2009)

== Team records ==
=== Notable wins against foreign teams ===
As of matches played 2 August 2024

Competition	Round	Year	Opposition	Score	Venue	City	Ref
POMIS Cup	Semi-finals	2003	(Maldives) Victory	2–1	Rasmee Dhandu Stadium	Malé	
POMIS Cup	Final	2003	(Maldives) Club Valencia	3–1	Rasmee Dhandu Stadium	Malé	
AFC Cup	Group stage	2004	(Oman) Dhofar	2–1	Jawaharlal Nehru Stadium	Margao	
AFC Cup	Group stage	2006	(Lebanon) Al Ahed	2–1	Jawaharlal Nehru Stadium	Margao	
AFC Cup	Group stage	2006	(Bangladesh) Brothers Union	1–0	Jawaharlal Nehru Stadium	Margao	
IFA Shield	Semi-finals	2006	(China) Shenzhen Kingway	1–0	Salt Lake Stadium	Kolkata	
AFC Cup	Group stage	2007	Singapore Armed Forces	2–0	Choa Chu Kang Stadium	Choa Chu Kang	
AFC Cup	Group stage	2007	(Hong Kong) Happy Valley	3–1	Jawaharlal Nehru Stadium	Margao	
AFC Cup	Group stage	2007	(Maldives) New Radiant	2–0	Rasmee Dhandu Stadium	Malé	
IFA Shield	Final	2008	(South Africa) Santos	3–1	Salt Lake Stadium	Kolkata	

== Other department ==
=== Field hockey ===
The club had its field hockey team that participated in both the Beighton Cup and Bombay Gold Cup. Two of the club's notable players are Sameer Dad – who represented India at the 1998 Asian Games and 1998 Men's Hockey World Cup, and Baljit Singh Dhillon – who appeared at the Summer Olympics.

Honours

- Bombay Gold Cup
  - Runners-up (4): 1974, 1976, 1982, 1986
- Guru Tegh Bahadur Gold Cup
  - Champions (1): 1980

== See also ==
- Indian football clubs in Asian competitions
- Sports in Maharashtra
- List of football clubs in Mumbai
- Defunct football clubs in India
