= Riston Rodrigues =

Indian footballer

Personal information
- Full name: Riston Rodrigues
- Date of birth: 11 October 1979 (age 47)
- Place of birth: Goa, India
- Height: 1.70 m (5 ft 7 in)
- Position: Midfielder

Senior career*
Years	Team	Apps	(Gls)
2002–2003	Churchill Brothers		
2003–2004	Vasco		
2004–2008	Dempo		
2008–2009	Mumbai		
2009–2012	East Bengal		

Managerial career
- 2020–: Guardian Angel
- * Club domestic league appearances and goals

Riston Rodrigues (born 11 October 1979) is an Indian former footballer who played as a midfielder, most recently for East Bengal in the I-League.
