= 2003 POMIS Cup =

Tournament details
- Host country: Maldives
- Dates: 14 October – 25 October
- Teams: 6
- Venue(s): 1 (in 1 host city)

Final positions
- Champions: (India) Mahindra United

Tournament statistics
- Best player(s): (Maldives) Ali Ashfaq (Club Valencia)

The 2003 POMIS Cup was the 16th championship of an international soccer club tournament held in Maldives. The group stage started on 14 October 2003 and the final was played on 25 October 2003 at the Rasmee Dhandu Stadium, Malé, Maldives.

== Teams ==
The top four teams of 2003 Dhivehi League and two invited foreign clubs.

=== Teams and nation ===
Note: Table lists clubs in alphabetical order.

Team	Nation
Club Valencia	Maldives
Island FC	Maldives
Mahindra United	India
Negambo Youth	Sri Lanka
New Radiant	Maldives
Victory Sports Club	Maldives

== Group stage ==
=== Group A ===
Pos	Team	Pld	W	D	L	GF	GA	GD	Pts
1	Victory Sports Club	2	2	0	0	2	0	+2	6
2	Island FC	2	1	0	1	2	2	0	3
3	Negambo Youth	2	0	0	2	1	3	-2	0

14 October 2003	Island FC	2–1	Negambo Youth	Rasmee Dhandu Stadium, Malé

16 October 2003	Victory Sports Club	1–0	Negambo Youth	Rasmee Dhandu Stadium, Malé

18 October 2003	Victory Sports Club	1–0	Island FC	Rasmee Dhandu Stadium, Malé

=== Group B ===
Pos	Team	Pld	W	D	L	GF	GA	GD	Pts
1	Club Valencia	2	2	0	0	7	3	+4	6
2	Mahindra United	2	1	0	1	4	4	0	3
3	New Radiant	2	0	0	2	1	5	-4	0

15 October 2003	New Radiant	0–2	Mahindra United	Rasmee Dhandu Stadium, Malé

17 October 2003	Club Valencia	4–2	Mahindra United	Rasmee Dhandu Stadium, Malé

19 October 2003	Club Valencia	3–1	New Radiant	Rasmee Dhandu Stadium, Malé

=== Semi finals ===
21 October 2003	Club Valencia	1–1 (aet) (7–6 p)	Island FC	Rasmee Dhandu Stadium, Malé

21 October 2003	Victory Sports Club	1–2	Mahindra United	Rasmee Dhandu Stadium, Malé

=== Final ===
25 October 2003	Club Valencia	1–3	Mahindra United	Rasmee Dhandu Stadium, Malé
		Report (in Dhivehi)
