= POMIS Cup =

- Organiser(s): Football Association of Maldives
- Founded: 1987
- Region: Maldives
- Teams: 6
- Current champions: PDRM FA
- Most championships: New Radiant SC; Club Valencia

The POMIS Cup (known fully as President of Maldives Invitational Soccer Cup) used to be an international club football tournament kicked off in 1987 to promote the standards of football in the Maldives.

In 2003, two foreign clubs from India and Sri Lanka competed in the cup, Mahindra United and Negombo Youth. On 22 December 2014, the Football Association of Maldives (FAM) normalisation committee decided to restart POMIS Cup. On 19 January 2015, POMIS Cup committee rebranded the President of Maldives Invitational Soccer Cup to the People of Maldives Invitational Soccer Cup.

== Previous winners ==
- 1987: Renown Sports Club
- 1988: York SC
- 1989: Victory Sports Club
- 1990: Indian Youth Team
- 1991: York FC
- 1992: Club Valencia
- 1993: Kerala SC
- 1994: New Radiant SC
- 1995: New Radiant SC
- 1996: Club Valencia
- 1997: New Radiant SC
- 1998: Thailand Youth Team
- 1999: Hurriyya SC
- 2000: Hurriyya SC
- 2001: Club Valencia
- 2003: Mahindra United
- 2015: PDRM FA

== Peoples Cup (2015) teams ==
- Maziya S&RC
- New Radiant SC
- PDRM FA
- Singapore LionsXII

== Number of titles ==
Rank	Number of titles	Club	Year(s) won
1	3	New Radiant SC	1994, 1995, 1997
1	3	Club Valencia	1992, 1996, 2001
2	2	Hurriyya SC	1999
3	1	Renown Sports Club	1987
3	1	Victory Sports Club	1989
3	1	Kerala SC	1993
3	1	Mahindra United	2003
3	1	PDRM FA	2015
