= 2015 Delhi Dynamos FC season =

2015 season of Delhi Dynamos FC

Delhi Dynamos FC
2015 season
- Owner: (India) DEN Networks
- Head Coach: (Brazil) Roberto Carlos
- Stadium: Jawaharlal Nehru Stadium
- ISL: 4th
- ISL Finals: Semi-Final
- Top goalscorer: League: Four Players (3); All: Richard Gadze (4)
- Average home league attendance: 18,771
Home colours	Away colours

The 2015 Delhi Dynamos FC season was the club's second season since its establishment in 2014 and also their second season in the Indian Super League.

== Pre Season Friendly ==
Delhi Dynamos decided to go on a pre-season tour of Sweden and Denmark. On 10 September, The Dynamos became the first Indian Super League team to play against a European top division club by playing a friendly match against BK Häcken.

4 September 2015 Exhibition match	Delhi Dynamos FC (India)	1-3	(Sweden) Varbergs BoIS	Påskbergsvallen, Sweden

10 September 2015 Exhibition match	Delhi Dynamos FC (India)	2-7	(Sweden) BK Häcken	Scandinavia, Sweden

13 September 2015 Exhibition match	Delhi Dynamos FC (India)	3–2	(Sweden) Skene IF	Påskbergsvallen, Sweden
	Florent Malouda 42'; Adil Nabi 39', 67'		Daniel Perian 3'; Adam Johansson 65'

16 September 2015 Exhibition match	Delhi Dynamos FC (India)	0-0	(Denmark) FC Vestsjaelland	Slagelse, Denmark
				Stadium: Harboe Arena Slagelse

== Transfers ==
In: Note: Flags indicate national team as defined under FIFA eligibility rules; some limited exceptions apply. Players may hold more than one non-FIFA nationality.

No.	Pos.	Nation	Player
2	DF	NED	Serginho Greene (from (Cyprus) Othellos Athienou)
3	DF	BRA	Roberto Carlos
4	DF	BRA	Chicão (from (Brazil) Bahia)
6	DF	NOR	John Arne Riise (from (Cyprus) APOEL)
7	FW	BRA	Vinícius
8	MF	NED	Hans Mulder (from (Denmark) Nordsjælland)
9	FW	IND	Robin Singh (from (India) Bengaluru)
12	MF	IND	Gunashekar Vignesh (from (India) Bharat)
13	GK	ESP	Toni Doblas (from (Spain) Cornellà)
14	MF	IND	Zodingliana Ralte (from (India) Shillong Lajong)
15	MF	FRA	Florent Malouda (from (France) Metz)
16	MF	BRA	Gustavo Marmentini (loan from (Brazil) Atlético Paranaense)
17	FW	ITA	Stefano Monteleone (loan from (Italy) Juventus)
18	MF	MEX	Gustavo Godinez Vasqùez (loan from (Mexico) Querétaro)
19	DF	IND	Robert Lalthlamuana (loan from (India) East Bengal)
20	FW	IND	Seminlen Doungel (loan from (India) Bengaluru)
21	GK	IND	Ravi Kumar (loan from (India) Sporting Goa)
22	DF	IND	Naoba Singh (from (India) Royal Wahingdoh)
23	MF	IND	Souvik Chakraborty (loan from (India) Mohun Bagan)
24	MF	IND	Sehnaj Singh (loan from (India) Mohun Bagan)
25	DF	IND	Prabir Das (loan from (India) Mohun Bagan)
27	DF	IND	Anas Edathodika (loan from (India) Pune)
28	MF	IND	Shylo Malsawmtluanga (loan from (India) East Bengal)
33	GK	IND	Sanjiban Ghosh (loan from (India) Mumbai)
43	FW	GHA	Richard Gadze

Out: Note: Flags indicate national team as defined under FIFA eligibility rules; some limited exceptions apply. Players may hold more than one non-FIFA nationality.

No.	Pos.	Nation	Player
1	GK	BEL	Kristof Van Hout (to (Belgium) Westerlo)
2	DF	IND	Govin Singh (to (India) Royal Wahingdoh)
3	DF	NED	Stijn Houben (loan return to (Netherlands) Feyenoord)
4	DF	BEL	Wim Raymaekers
6	MF	NED	Hans Mulder (to (Denmark) Nordsjælland)
7	FW	DEN	Morten Skoubo
8	MF	IND	Adil Khan (to (India) Bharat)
9	FW	DEN	Mads Junker
10	FW	ITA	Alessandro Del Piero
13	MF	CZE	Pavel Eliáš (to (Czech Republic) Dynamo České Budějovice)
14	MF	POR	Henrique Dinis (to (Croatia) Istra 1961)
15	MF	ESP	Bruno (to (India) NorthEast United)
16	MF	BRA	Gustavo Marmentini (loan return to (Brazil) Atlético Paranaense)
17	FW	IND	Manandeep Singh (to (India) Kerala Blasters)
18	DF	IND	Munmun Lugun (to (India) Pune)
19	DF	IND	Robert Lalthlamuana (loan return to (India) East Bengal)
20	MF	IND	Souvik Chakraborty (loan return to (India) Mohun Bagan)
21	GK	IND	Jagroop Singh
23	MF	IND	Steven Dias (to (India) Bharat)
24	GK	CZE	Marek Čech
26	DF	IND	Shouvik Ghosh (loan return to (India) Mohun Bagan)
34	MF	IND	Manish Bhargav (loan return to (India) Mohun Bagan)

== Squad ==
As of 17 September 2015.

Note: Flags indicate national team as defined under FIFA eligibility rules; some limited exceptions apply. Players may hold more than one non-FIFA nationality.

No.	Pos.	Nation	Player
2	MF	NED	Serginho Greene
3	DF	BRA	Roberto Carlos
4	DF	BRA	Chicão
5	DF	IND	Anwar Ali
6	DF	NOR	John Arne Riise
7	FW	BRA	Vinícius
8	MF	NED	Hans Mulder
9	FW	IND	Robin Singh
10	FW	ENG	Adil Nabi (on loan from West Bromwich Albion)
11	MF	IND	Francis Fernandes
12	MF	IND	Gunashekar Vignesh
13	GK	ESP	Toni Doblas
14	MF	IND	Zodingliana Ralte (on loan from Shillong Lajong)
15	MF	FRA	Florent Malouda (captain)

No.	Pos.	Nation	Player
16	FW	BRA	Gustavo Marmentini (on loan from Atlético Paranaense)
17	FW	ITA	Stefano Monteleon (on loan from Juventus FC)
18	FW	MEX	Gustavo Godinez (on loan from Querétaro)
19	DF	IND	Robert Lalthlamuana (on loan from East Bengal)
20	FW	IND	Seminlen Doungel (on loan from Bengaluru FC)
21	GK	IND	Ravi Kumar (on loan from Sporting Goa)
22	DF	IND	Naoba Singh
23	MF	IND	Souvik Chakraborty (on loan from Mohun Bagan)
24	MF	IND	Sehnaj Singh
25	DF	IND	Prabir Das (on loan from Dempo)
27	DF	IND	Anas Edathodika (on loan from Pune)
28	MF	IND	Shylo Malsawmtluanga (on loan from East Bengal)
33	GK	IND	Sanjiban Ghosh
43	FW	GHA	Richard Gadze

=== Technical Staff ===
Position	Name
Head coach	(Brazil) Roberto Carlos
Assistant coach and Technical Director - Grassroots	(India) Raman Vijayan
Assistant coach and Technical Director - Grassroots	(India) Shakti Chauhan
Physical trainer	(Brazil) Walmir Cruz
Goalkeeper coach	(Argentina) Leonardo Franco

== Indian Super League ==
=== First round ===
==== League table ====
Pos	Team	Pld	W	D	L	GF	GA	GD	Pts	Qualification or relegation
2	Atlético de Kolkata	14	7	2	5	26	17	+9	23	Advance to ISL Play-offs
3	Chennaiyin (C)	14	7	1	6	25	15	+10	22	Advance to ISL Play-offs
4	Delhi Dynamos	14	6	4	4	18	20	−2	22	Advance to ISL Play-offs
5	NorthEast United	14	6	2	6	18	23	−5	20	
6	Mumbai City	14	4	4	6	16	26	−10	16	

Source: Indian Super League standings
Rules for classification: 1) points; 2) goal difference; 3) number of goals scored.
(C) Champions

==== Results summary ====
Overall								Home						Away					
Pld	W	D	L	GF	GA	GD	Pts	W	D	L	GF	GA	GD	W	D	L	GF	GA	GD
14	6	4	4	18	20	−2	22	2	4	1	12	10	+2	4	0	3	6	10	−4

Last updated: 6 December 2015.
Source: Matches

==== Results by round ====
Round	1	2	3	4	5	6	7	8	9	10	11	12	13	14
Ground	A	H	A	A	A	A	H	H	H	H	A	A	H	H
Result	L	W	W	W	L	W	D	D	W	W	L	W	D	L

Updated to match(es) played on 6 December 2015. Source: Matches
A = Away; H = Home; W = Win; D = Draw; L = Loss

==== Matches ====
4 October 2015 1	Goa	2 – 0	Delhi Dynamos	Goa
19:00 IST (UTC+5:30)	Chakraborty 3' (o.g.); Reinaldo 45+3'; Jofre (yellow card) 68'; Sabrosa (yellow card) 90+3'	Report	Marmentini (yellow card) 68'	Stadium: Fatorda Stadium; Attendance: 18,567; Referee: Pranjal Banerji

8 October 2015 2	Delhi Dynamos	1 – 0	Chennaiyin	Delhi
19:00 IST (UTC+5:30)	Z.Ralte (yellow card) 6'; Chicão 8' (pen.); Riise (yellow card) 16'; Mulder (yellow card) 25'	Report	Potenza (yellow card) 12'; L.Ralte (yellow card) 48'	Stadium: Jawaharlal Nehru Stadium; Attendance: 19,453; Referee: Tejas Nagvenkar

14 October 2015 3	Pune City	1 – 2	Delhi Dynamos	Pune
19:00 IST (UTC+5:30)	Uche 90+8'	Report	R.Singh 23'; Riise (yellow card) 45'; Edathodika (yellow card) 60'; Gadze 90+7'	Stadium: Shree Shiv Chhatrapati Sports Complex; Attendance: 7,231

18 October 2015 4	Kerala Blasters	0 – 1	Delhi Dynamos	Kochi
19:00 IST (UTC+5:30)	Vineeth (yellow card) 82'	Report	Gadze 87'	Stadium: Jawaharlal Nehru Stadium; Attendance: 53,539

21 October 2014 5	Mumbai City	2 – 0	Delhi Dynamos	Mumbai
19:00 IST (UTC+5:30)	Bustos (yellow card) 9'; Chhetri 13', 74' (yellow card) 40'; Aguilera (yellow card) 36'; Čmovš (yellow card) 53'; O'Dea (yellow card) 59'; S.Singh (yellow card) 66'; Shirodkar (yellow card) 76'	Report	Chicão (yellow card) 49'; Chakraborty (yellow card) 56'; Mulder (yellow card) 90'	Stadium: DY Patil Stadium; Attendance: 22,789

29 October 2015 6	Atlético de Kolkata	0 – 1	Delhi Dynamos	Kolkata
19:00 IST (UTC+5:30)	Sahni (yellow card) 45+1'; Hume (yellow card) 56'	Report	Riise (yellow card) 45'; Chakraborty (yellow card) 71' (yellow-red card) 80'; Chicão (yellow card) 86'; Marmentini 90+3' (yellow card) 90+4'	Stadium: Salt Lake Stadium; Attendance: 41,145

3 November 2015 7	Delhi Dynamos	1 – 1	NorthEast United	Delhi
19:00 IST (UTC+5:30)	R.Singh (yellow card) 23'; Gadze 37' (yellow card) 63'; S.Singh (yellow card) 81'	Report	Raju (yellow card) 45'; López (yellow card) 50'; Simão 72'; Pradhan (yellow card) 75'; Bruno (yellow card) 84'	Stadium: Jawaharlal Nehru Stadium; Attendance: 25,163

6 November 2015 8	Delhi Dynamos	1 – 1	Mumbai City	Delhi
19:00 IST (UTC+5:30)	R.Singh 90+4'	Report	Mawia (yellow card) 53'; Piquionne 70'; Benachour (yellow card) 90+4'	Stadium: Jawaharlal Nehru Stadium; Attendance: 15,142

14 November 2015 9	Delhi Dynamos	1 – 1	Atlético de Kolkata	Delhi
19:00 IST (UTC+5:30)	Richard Gadze 61'; Edathodika (yellow card) 70'	Report	Iain Hume 27'; Tiri (yellow card) 73'; Gavilán (yellow card) 85'; Anto (yellow card) 88'	Stadium: Jawaharlal Nehru Stadium; Attendance: 14,511

19 November 2015 10	Delhi Dynamos	3 – 1	Pune City	Delhi
19:00 IST (UTC+5:30)	Nabi 35'; Edathodika 40'; Malouda (yellow card) 58'; Riise 87' (pen.)	Report	Johnson (yellow card) 13'; Shorey (yellow card) 51'; G.Singh (yellow card) 67' (yellow-red card) 86'; Mutu 90+5'	Stadium: Jawaharlal Nehru Stadium; Attendance: 19,673

24 November 2015 11	Chennaiyin	4 – 0	Delhi Dynamos	Chennai
19:00 IST (UTC+5:30)	Mendoza 17' (yellow card) 17'; Pelissari 21'; Lalpekhlua 40', 54'; Khabra (yellow card) 60'	Report	Mulder (yellow card) 62'	Stadium: Jawaharlal Nehru Stadium; Attendance: 21,789

28 November 2015 12	NorthEast United	1 – 2	Delhi Dynamos	Guwahati
19:00 IST (UTC+5:30)	Sa.Singh 37'; Re.Singh (yellow card) 39'; Kamara (yellow card) 44'	Report	Chicão (yellow card) 14'; Ro.Singh 30' (yellow card) 54'; Se.Singh (yellow card) 44'; Vinícius (yellow card) 50'; Gadze (yellow card) 52'; Marmentini 88' (yellow card) 90+2'	Stadium: Indira Gandhi Athletic Stadium; Attendance: 22,801

3 December 2015 13	Delhi Dynamos	3 – 3	Kerala Blasters	Delhi
19:00 IST (UTC+5:30)	Marmentini 7'; Nabi 40'; Greene (yellow card) 57'; S.Singh	Report	Dagnall 9'; Coimbra 30'; Jhingan (yellow card) 31'; German 39'; Hossain (yellow card) 48'; Ahmed (yellow card) 75'	Stadium: Jawaharlal Nehru Stadium; Attendance: 24,089

6 December 2015 14	Delhi Dynamos	2 – 3	Goa	Delhi
19:00 IST (UTC+5:30)	R.Singh (yellow card) 14'; Greene 31'; Nabi 40'; Vinícius (yellow card) 65'; Chakraborty (yellow card) 65'; Lalthlamuana (yellow card) 90+2'	Report	Halder (yellow card) 14'; Lúcio (yellow card) 63'; Fernandes 68', 69'; Romeo Fernandes 90'	Stadium: Jawaharlal Nehru Stadium; Attendance: 17,990

=== Finals ===
11 December 2015 Semifinal 1st leg	Delhi Dynamos	1 – 0	Goa	Delhi
19:00 IST (UTC+5:30)	Lalthlamuana (yellow card) 14'; R.Singh 42'; Chicão (yellow card) 44'	Report	Reinaldo (yellow card) 59'; Moura (yellow card) 68'	Stadium: Jawaharlal Nehru Stadium; Attendance: 23,874

15 December 2015 Semifinal 2nd leg	Goa	3 – 0 (3 – 1 agg.)	Delhi Dynamos	Goa
19:00 IST (UTC+5:30)	Jofre 11' (yellow card) 49'; Coelho 27'; Halder (yellow card) 37'; Desai (yellow card) 58'; Jonatan (yellow card) 69'; B.Singh (yellow card) 76'; Dudu 84'	Report	Marmentini (yellow card) 34'; Malsawmtluanga (yellow card) 88'; Nabi (red card) 88'; Mulder (yellow card) 90+3'	Stadium: Fatorda Stadium; Attendance: 19,796

== Squad statistics ==
As of Match played 15 December 2015

=== Appearances and goals ===
No.	Pos	Nat	Player	Total		Indian Super League		Finals	
No.	Pos	Nat	Player	Apps	Goals	Apps	Goals	Apps	Goals
1	GK	(India) IND	Subhashish Roy Chowdhury	1	0	1	0	0	0
2	MF	(Netherlands) NED	Serginho Greene	4	1	2+2	1	0	0
3	DF	(Brazil) BRA	Roberto Carlos	3	0	1+2	0	0	0
4	DF	(Brazil) BRA	Chicão	11	1	9	1	2	0
5	DF	(India) IND	Anwar Ali	3	0	2+1	0	0	0
6	DF	(Norway) NOR	John Arne Riise	14	1	12	1	2	0
7	MF	(Brazil) BRA	Vinícius	11	0	5+5	0	0+1	0
8	MF	(Netherlands) NED	Hans Mulder	13	0	10+1	0	0+2	0
9	FW	(India) IND	Robin Singh	12	4	9+1	3	2	1
10	FW	(England) ENG	Adil Nabi	10	3	5+3	3	2	0
11	MF	(India) IND	Francis Fernandes	5	0	4+1	0	0	0
13	GK	(Spain) ESP	Toni Doblas	11	0	9	0	2	0
14	MF	(India) IND	Zodingliana Ralte	11	0	11	0	0	0
15	MF	(France) FRA	Florent Malouda	15	0	13	0	2	0
16	FW	(Brazil) BRA	Gustavo Marmentini	14	3	5+7	3	2	0
19	DF	(India) IND	Robert Lalthlamuana	3	0	1	0	2	0
20	FW	(India) IND	Seminlen Doungel	6	0	3+2	0	0+1	0
22	DF	(India) IND	Naoba Singh	1	0	0+1	0	0	0
23	MF	(India) IND	Souvik Chakraborty	11	0	11	0	0	0
24	MF	(India) IND	Sehnaj Singh	9	1	5+2	1	2	0
27	DF	(India) IND	Anas Edathodika	13	1	11	1	2	0
28	MF	(India) IND	Shylo Malsawmtluanga	8	0	4+2	0	2	0
33	GK	(India) IND	Sanjiban Ghosh	3	0	3	0	0	0
43	FW	(Ghana) GHA	Richard Gadze	14	3	7+5	3	0+2	0

=== Goal scorers ===
Place	Position	Nation	Number	Name	Indian Super League	Finals	Total
1	FW	(India)	9	Robin Singh	3	1	4
2	FW	(Ghana)	43	Richard Gadze	3	0	3
2	FW	(Brazil)	16	Gustavo Marmentini	3	0	3
2	FW	(England)	10	Adil Nabi	3	0	3
5	DF	(Brazil)	4	Chicão	1	0	1
5	DF	(India)	27	Anas Edathodika	1	0	1
5	DF	(Norway)	6	John Arne Riise	1	0	1
5	MF	(India)	24	Sehnaj Singh	1	0	1
5	MF	(Netherlands)	2	Serginho Greene	1	0	1
				TOTALS	17	1	18

=== Disciplinary record ===
Number	Nation	Position	Name	Indian Super League		Finals		Total	
Number	Nation	Position	Name	Yellow card	Red card	Yellow card	Red card	Yellow card	Red card
2	(Netherlands)	DF	Serginho Greene	1	0	0	0	1	0
4	(Brazil)	DF	Chicão	3	0	1	0	4	0
6	(Norway)	DF	John Arne Riise	3	0	0	0	3	0
7	(Brazil)	MF	Vinícius	2	0	0	0	2	0
8	(Netherlands)	MF	Hans Mulder	3	0	1	0	4	0
9	(India)	FW	Robin Singh	3	0	0	0	3	0
10	(England)	FW	Adil Nabi	0	0	0	1	0	1
14	(India)	MF	Zodingliana Ralte	1	0	0	0	1	0
15	(France)	MF	Florent Malouda	1	0	0	0	1	0
16	(Brazil)	MF	Gustavo Marmentini	3	0	1	0	4	0
19	(India)	DF	Robert Lalthlamuana	1	0	1	0	2	0
23	(India)	MF	Souvik Chakraborty	4	1	0	0	4	1
24	(India)	MF	Sehnaj Singh	3	0	0	0	3	0
27	(India)	DF	Anas Edathodika	1	0	0	0	1	0
28	(India)	MF	Shylo Malsawmtluanga	0	0	1	0	1	0
43	(Ghana)	FW	Richard Gadze	2	0	0	0	2	0
			TOTALS	31	1	5	1	36	2
