= 2016 Chennaiyin FC season =

2016 season of Chennaiyin FC

Chennaiyin
2016 season
- Head Coach: Marco Materazzi
- Stadium: Jawaharlal Nehru Stadium
- ISL: 7th
- ISL finals: DNQ
- Top goalscorer: League: Dudu Omagbemi (5); All: Dudu Omagbemi (5)
- Highest home attendance: 25,235 vs NorthEast United FC
- Lowest home attendance: 18,213 vs FC Goa
- Average home league attendance: 22,139
- Biggest win: 2-0 (vs FC Goa on 13 Oct 2016 and vs FC Pune City on 15 Nov 2016)
- Biggest defeat: 1-4 (vs Delhi Dynamos FC on 9 Nov 2016)
Home colours	Away colours

The 2016 Chennaiyin FC season was the club's third season since its establishment in 2014 and their third season in the Indian Super League.

== Background ==
Going into the 2015 ISL season, Chennaiyin retained their head coach, Marco Materazzi, as well as the core of their playing squad with players such as Jeje Lalpekhlua, Balwant Singh, Jayesh Rane, Bernard Mendy, and marquee Elano returning for a second season. They began their season on 3 October 2015, hosting their first match of the ISL season against defending champions Atlético de Kolkata. Despite goals from Lalpekhlua and Elano, Chennaiyin lost the match 3–2. Despite a slow start to the season, Chennaiyin soon entered the finals, finishing the season in third place.

In the semi-finals, Chennaiyin FC took on Atlético de Kolkata. In the first leg of the round, Chennaiyin came out as 3–0 winners after goals from Bruno Pelissari, Jeje Lalpekhlua, and Stiven Mendoza. Despite losing the second leg 2–1, Chennaiyin went through to the finals 4–2 on aggregate.

During the final, Chennaiyin took on Goa at the Fatorda Stadium. They took a 1–0 lead in the beginning of the second half from Bruno Pelissari before Goa came back to lead 2–1 going into stoppage time. However, an own goal from Goa goalkeeper, Laxmikant Kattimani, and a goal from Mendoza from a defensive mistake lead to Chennaiyin winning to Indian Super League.

== Player movement ==
=== Squad ===
As of 18 September 2016.

Note: Flags indicate national team as defined under FIFA eligibility rules; some limited exceptions apply. Players may hold more than one non-FIFA nationality.

No.	Pos.	Nation	Player
1	GK	IND	Karanjit Singh
2	DF	BRA	Éder
3	DF	IND	Nallappan Mohanraj
4	MF	NED	Hans Mulder (3rd captain)
5	DF	FRA	Bernard Mendy (captain)
6	DF	NOR	John Arne Riise
7	MF	IND	Harmanjot Khabra
8	MF	ITA	Manuele Blasi
9	FW	ITA	Davide Succi
10	FW	IND	Jayesh Rane
11	MF	IND	Thoi Singh
12	FW	IND	Jeje Lalpekhlua
13	DF	BRA	Eli Sabiá
15	DF	IND	Abhishek Das

No.	Pos.	Nation	Player
16	FW	IND	Daniel Lalhlimpuia
17	MF	IND	Dhanpal Ganesh
18	MF	IND	Siam Hanghal
19	MF	BRA	Raphael Augusto
20	FW	ITA	Maurizio Peluso
21	FW	IND	Uttam Rai
22	MF	IND	Zakeer Mundampara
25	DF	IND	Dhanachandra Singh
26	DF	IND	Mehrajuddin Wadoo (vice captain)
27	GK	JAM	Duwayne Kerr
28	GK	IND	Pawan Kumar
33	FW	IND	Baljit Sahni
43	DF	IND	Jerry Lalrinzuala
99	FW	NGR	Dudu Omagbemi

=== Technical staff ===
Position	Name
Head coach	(Italy) Marco Materazzi
Performance Analyst	(Italy) Franco Pasqualetti
Assistant coach	(India) Syed Sabir Pasha
Goalkeeping coach	(Italy) Francesco Franzese
Consultant	(India) Pratham Basu
Physiotherapist	(India) Manoj Muthu

== Transfers ==
In: Note: Flags indicate national team as defined under FIFA eligibility rules; some limited exceptions apply. Players may hold more than one non-FIFA nationality.

No.	Pos.	Nation	Player

Out: Note: Flags indicate national team as defined under FIFA eligibility rules; some limited exceptions apply. Players may hold more than one non-FIFA nationality.

No.	Pos.	Nation	Player

== Indian Super League ==
Pos	Team	Pld	W	D	L	GF	GA	GD	Pts	Qualification
4	Atlético de Kolkata (C)	14	4	8	2	16	14	+2	20	Advance to ISL Play-offs
5	NorthEast United	14	5	3	6	14	14	0	18	
6	Pune City	14	4	4	6	13	16	−3	16	
7	Chennaiyin	14	3	6	5	20	25	−5	15	
8	Goa	14	4	2	8	15	25	−10	14	

Source: Indian Super League
Rules for classification: 1) points; 2) head-to-head points; 3) head-to-head goal difference; 4) goal difference; 5) number of goals scored; 6) play-off match
(C) Champions

=== Results summary ===
Overall								Home						Away					
Pld	W	D	L	GF	GA	GD	Pts	W	D	L	GF	GA	GD	W	D	L	GF	GA	GD
14	3	6	5	20	25	−5	15	2	4	1	10	8	+2	1	2	4	10	17	−7

Last updated: October 2016.
Source: Matches

=== Matches ===
Win Draw Loss

2 October 2016 Match 2	Atlético de Kolkata	2-2	Chennaiyin	Kolkata, West Bengal, India
19:00 IST (UTC+5:30)	Pritam Kotal (yellow card) 36'; Hélder Postiga (yellow card) 37'; Sameehg Doutie 59'; Bikramjit Singh (yellow card) 64'; Iain Hume 86' (pen.)		Davide Succi (yellow card) 55'; John Arne Riise (yellow card) 60'; Jayesh Rane (yellow card) 61' (goal) 66'; Hans Mulder 70'	Stadium: Rabindra Sarobar Stadium, Kolkata; Attendance: 10,973

6 October 2016 Match 6	Chennaiyin	1-3	Delhi Dynamos FC	Chennai, Tamil Nadu, India
19:00 IST (UTC+5:30)	Dudu Omagbemi 32'; Raphael Augusto (yellow card) 51'		Marcelinho 26' (pen.) 34' (yellow card) 60'; Badara Badji 84'	Stadium: Jawaharlal Nehru Stadium; Attendance: 21,587

13 October 2016 Match 12	Chennaiyin	2-0	FC Goa	Chennai, Tamil Nadu, India
19:00 IST (UTC+5:30)	Hans Mulder 15'; Mehrajuddin Wadoo 26'		Matheus Trindade Goncalves (yellow card) 52'	Stadium: Jawaharlal Nehru Stadium; Attendance: 18,213

20 October 2016 Match 18	NorthEast United FC	0-1	Chennaiyin	Guwahati, Assam, India
19:00 IST (UTC+5:30)	Wellington Priori (yellow card) 59'		Bernard Mendy (yellow card) 35'; Davide Succi 49'; Jerry Lalrinzuala (yellow card) 83'	Stadium: Indira Gandhi Athletic Stadium; Attendance: 32,844

23 October 2016 Match 21	FC Pune City	1-1	Chennaiyin	Pune, Maharashtra, India
19:00 IST (UTC+5:30)	Dharmaraj Ravanan (yellow card) 9'; Dramane Traoré (yellow card) 77'; Aníbal Zurdo 83'		Siam Hanghal (yellow card) 14'; Jeje Lalpekhlua 28'; Mehrajuddin Wadoo (yellow card) 68'; Harmanjot Khabra (yellow card) 81'	Stadium: Shree Shiv Chhatrapati Sports Complex; Attendance: 9,013

29 October 2016 Match 26	Chennaiyin	0-0	Kerala Blasters	Chennai, Tamil Nadu, India
19:00 IST (UTC+5:30)	Maurizio Peluso (yellow card) 68'			Stadium: Jawaharlal Nehru Stadium; Attendance: 23,163

2 November 2016 Match 28	Chennaiyin	1-1	Mumbai City FC	Chennai, Tamil Nadu, India
19:00 IST (UTC+5:30)	Jeje Lalpekhlua 51'; Raphael Augusto (yellow card) 80'		Anwar Ali (yellow card) 22'; Krisztián Vadócz (yellow card) 80'; Léo Costa 88'	Stadium: Jawaharlal Nehru Stadium; Attendance: 22,280

9 November 2016 Match 34	Delhi Dynamos FC	4-1	Chennaiyin	Delhi
19:00 IST (UTC+5:30)	Richard Gadze 15'; Florent Malouda 25' 85'; Kean Lewis 54'; Souvik Chakraborty (yellow card) 60'		Bernard Mendy 37'; Hans Mulder (yellow card) 39'; Dudu Omagbemi (yellow card) 45'	Stadium: Jawaharlal Nehru Stadium; Attendance: 15,111

12 November 2016 Match 37	Kerala Blasters	3-1	Chennaiyin	Kochi, Kerala
19:00 IST (UTC+5:30)	Graham Stack (yellow card) 54'; Didier Kadio 66'; C.K.Vineeth 85' 89'		Bernard Mendy 22'; Hans Mulder (yellow card) 90'	Stadium: Jawaharlal Nehru Stadium; Attendance: 53,152

15 November 2016 Match 39	Chennaiyin	2-0	Pune City	Chennai, Tamil Nadu
19:00 IST (UTC+5:30)	Jeje Lalpekhlua 44'; Davide Succi 51'			Stadium: Jawaharlal Nehru Stadium; Attendance: 19,773

20 November 2016 Match 44	Chennaiyin	1-1	Atlético de Kolkata	Chennai, Tamil Nadu
19:00 IST (UTC+5:30)	Bernard Mendy (yellow card) 75'; Davide Succi 77'		Keegan Pereira (yellow card) 34'; Hélder Postiga 39'; Debjit Majumder (yellow card) 90'	Stadium: Jawaharlal Nehru Stadium; Attendance: 24,725

23 November 2016 Match 46	Mumbai City	2-0	Chennaiyin	Mumbai, Maharashtra
19:00 IST (UTC+5:30)	Gerson Vieira (yellow card) 7'; Matías Defederico 32'; Sehnaj Singh (yellow card) 55'; Krisztián Vadócz 60'			Stadium: Mumbai Football Arena; Referee: 7,645

26 November 2016 Match 49	Chennaiyin	3-3	NorthEast United	Chennai, Tamil Nadu
19:00 IST (UTC+5:30)	Dudu Omagbemi 34' 45' 81'; Siam Hanghal (yellow card) 88'; Mehrajuddin Wadoo (yellow card) 89'		Nicolás Vélez 38' 51' (yellow card) 89'; Shouvik Ghosh 90'	Stadium: Jawaharlal Nehru Stadium; Attendance: 25,235

1 December 2016 Match 53	Goa	5-4	Chennaiyin	Margao, Goa
19:00 IST (UTC+5:30)	Rafael Coelho 6' (yellow card) 6' (goal) 76'; Jofre 21' (pen.); Rafael Dumas (yellow card) 25'; Mandar Rao Desai (yellow card) 43'; Sahil Tavora 69' 90'; Júlio César (yellow card) 90'		Jerry Lalrinzuala 4' (yellow card) 58'; Grégory Arnolin 18' (OG.); Dudu Omagbemi 28'; John Arne Riise 88' (pen.)	Stadium: Fatorda Stadium; Attendance: 14,717

== Squad statistics ==
=== Appearances and goals ===
No.	Pos	Nat	Player	Total		Indian Super League	
No.	Pos	Nat	Player	Apps	Goals	Apps	Goals
1	GK	(India) IND	Karanjit Singh	9	0	9+0	0
2	DF	(Brazil) BRA	Éder	2	0	2+0	0
3	DF	(India) IND	Nallappan Mohanraj	1	0	1+0	0
4	MF	(Netherlands) NED	Hans Mulder	12	2	11+1	2
5	DF	(France) FRA	Bernard Mendy	12	2	11+1	2
6	DF	(Norway) NOR	John Arne Riise	10	1	7+3	1
7	MF	(India) IND	Harmanjot Khabra	6	0	3+3	0
8	MF	(Italy) ITA	Manuele Blasi	6	0	4+2	0
9	FW	(Italy) ITA	Davide Succi	13	3	9+4	3
10	FW	(India) IND	Jayesh Rane	8	1	6+2	1
11	MF	(India) IND	Thoi Singh	2	0	2+0	0
12	FW	(India) IND	Jeje Lalpekhlua	9	3	7+2	3
13	DF	(Brazil) BRA	Eli Sabiá	11	0	10+1	0
15	DF	(India) IND	Abhishek Das	1	0	1+0	0
16	FW	(India) IND	Daniel Lalhlimpuia	3	0	1+2	0
18	MF	(India) IND	Siam Hanghal	10	0	7+3	0
19	MF	(Brazil) BRA	Raphael Augusto	14	0	12+2	0
20	FW	(Italy) ITA	Maurizio Peluso	3	0	2+1	0
21	FW	(India) IND	Uttam Rai	1	0	0+1	0
22	MF	(India) IND	Zakeer Mundampara	5	0	5+0	0
26	DF	(India) IND	Mehrajuddin Wadoo	13	1	13+0	1
27	GK	(Jamaica) JAM	Duwayne Kerr	5	0	5+0	0
33	FW	(India) IND	Baljit Sahni	8	0	6+2	0
42	MF	(India) IND	Anirudh Thapa	1	0	1+0	0
43	DF	(India) IND	Jerry Lalrinzuala	13	1	11+2	1
99	FW	(Nigeria) NGR	Dudu Omagbemi	13	5	7+6	5

=== Goal scorers ===
S.No.	Position	Number	Name	Goals
1	FW	99	(Nigeria) Dudu Omagbemi	5
2	FW	12	(India) Jeje Lalpekhlua	3
2	FW	9	(Italy) Davide Succi	3
4	MF	4	(Netherlands) Hans Mulder	2
4	DF	5	(France) Bernard Mendy	2
6	FW	10	(India) Jayesh Rane	1
6	DF	26	(India) Mehrajuddin Wadoo	1
6	DF	42	(India) Jerry Lalrinzuala	1
6	DF	6	(Norway) John Arne Riise	1
			Total	19

=== Disciplinary record ===
Number	Position	Name	Yellow card	Red card
4	MF	(Netherlands) Hans Mulder	2	0
5	DF	(France) Bernard Mendy	2	0
6	DF	(Norway) John Arne Riise	1	0
7	DF	(India) Harmanjot Khabra	1	0
8	MF	(Italy) Manuele Blasi	1	0
9	FW	(Italy) Davide Succi	1	0
10	FW	(India) Jayesh Rane	1	0
18	MF	(India) Siam Hanghal	3	0
19	MF	(Brazil) Raphael Augusto	2	0
20	FW	(Italy) Maurizio Peluso	1	0
26	DF	(India) Mehrajuddin Wadoo	2	0
43	DF	(India) Jerry Lalrinzuala	2	0
99	FW	(Nigeria) Dudu Omagbemi	1	0
		Total	20	0

== See also ==
- 2016–17 in Indian football
