= 2015 Chennaiyin FC season =

2015 season of Chennaiyin FC

Chennaiyin FC
2015 season
- Manager: Marco Materazzi
- Stadium: Jawaharlal Nehru stadium, Chennai
- Indian Super League: Winners
- Top goalscorer: League: Stiven Mendoza (13); All: Stiven Mendoza (13)
- Highest home attendance: 30000 vs Atlético de Kolkata
- Lowest home attendance: 12,636 vs Mumbai City FC
- Average home league attendance: 22,721
- Biggest win: 4-0 (vs FC Goa on 11 Oct 2015 and vs Delhi Dynamos on 24 Nov 2015)
- Biggest defeat: 0-2 (vs NorthEast United on 20 Oct 2015 and vs FC Goa on 5 Nov 2015)
Home colours	Away colours

The 2015 season was Chennaiyin FC's second season of Indian Super League. Chennayin defeated FC Goa 3–2 in the finals to win the cup.

== Squad ==
As of 21 December 2015:

Note: Flags indicate national team as defined under FIFA eligibility rules; some limited exceptions apply. Players may hold more than one non-FIFA nationality.

No.	Pos.	Nation	Player
1	GK	IND	Karanjit Singh
2	DF	BRA	Éder
3	MF	IND	Dhanpal Ganesh (on loan from Pune)
4	DF	IND	Justin Stephen (on loan from Mumbai)
5	DF	FRA	Bernard Mendy
6	MF	ITA	Manuele Blasi
7	MF	BRA	Elano (on loan from Santos)
8	MF	IND	Godwin Franco
9	FW	ETH	Fikru
10	FW	IND	Jayesh Rane (on loan from Mumbai)
11	MF	IND	Thoi Singh (on loan from Bengaluru FC)
12	FW	IND	Jeje Lalpekhlua
13	GK	IND	Nidhin Lal
14	FW	COL	Stiven Mendoza (on loan from Corinthians)
15	DF	IND	Abhishek Das (on loan from East Bengal)

No.	Pos.	Nation	Player
17	FW	IND	Balwant Singh
18	MF	IND	Harmanjot Khabra (on loan from East Bengal)
19	MF	BRA	Raphael Augusto (on loan from Fluminense)
20	MF	BRA	Bruno Pelissari (on loan from Atlético Paranaense)
21	DF	IND	Lalhmangaihsanga (on loan from Royal Wahingdoh)
22	MF	IND	Zakeer Mundampara
24	GK	ARM	Apoula Edel
25	DF	IND	Dhanachandra Singh (on loan from Mohun Bagan)
26	DF	IND	Mehrajuddin Wadoo
27	DF	BRA	Maílson Alves
31	DF	ITA	Alessandro Potenza

=== Technical staff ===
As of 27 June 2015

Position	Name
Head Coach & Manager	(Italy) Marco Materazzi
Assistant coach	(India) Vivek Nagul
Goalkeeping coach	(Italy) Francesco Franzese

== Transfers ==
In: Note: Flags indicate national team as defined under FIFA eligibility rules; some limited exceptions apply. Players may hold more than one non-FIFA nationality.

No.	Pos.	Nation	Player
1	GK	IND	Karanjit Singh (from (India) Salgaocar)
2	DF	BRA	Éder (from (Greece) Nea Salamis Famagusta)
3	MF	IND	Dhanpal Ganesh (loan from (India) Pune)
4	DF	IND	Justin Stephen (loan from (India) Mumbai)
5	DF	FRA	Bernard Mendy (from (Cyprus) AEL Limassol)
6	MF	ITA	Manuele Blasi (from (Italy) Varese)
7	MF	BRA	Elano Blumer (loan from (Brazil) Santos)
8	MF	IND	Godwin Franco (from (India) Royal Wahingdoh)
9	FW	ETH	Fikru Teferra (from (South Africa) Bidvest Wits)
10	MF	IND	Jayesh Rane (loan extended (India) Mumbai)
11	MF	IND	Thoi Singh (from (India) Bengaluru)
12	FW	IND	Jeje Lalpekhlua (from (India) Mohun Bagan, previously on loan)
13	GK	IND	Nidhin Lal (from (India) Mumbai)
14	FW	COL	Stiven Mendoza (loan from (Brazil) Corinthians)
15	DF	IND	Abhishek Das (loan extended from (India) East Bengal)
17	FW	IND	Balwant Singh (from (India) Mohun Bagan, previously on loan)
18	MF	IND	Harmanjot Khabra (loan extended (India) East Bengal)
19	MF	BRA	Raphael Augusto (loan from (Brazil) Fluminense)
20	MF	BRA	Bruno Pelissari (loan extended (Brazil) Atlético Paranaense)
21	DF	IND	Lalhmangaihsanga (loan from (India) Royal Wahingdoh)
22	MF	IND	Zakeer Mundampara (from (India) Salgaocar)
24	GK	ARM	Apoula Edel (from (Israel) Hapoel Tel Aviv)
25	DF	IND	Dhanachandra Singh (loan extended from (India) Mohun Bagan)
26	DF	IND	Mehrajuddin Wadoo (from (India) Pune City)
27	DF	BRA	Maílson Alves (from (Brazil) Tupi)
31	DF	ITA	Alessandro Potenza (from (Italy) Modena)

Out: Note: Flags indicate national team as defined under FIFA eligibility rules; some limited exceptions apply. Players may hold more than one non-FIFA nationality.

No.	Pos.	Nation	Player
1	GK	FRA	Gennaro Bracigliano (to (India) NorthEast United)
2	DF	COL	Jairo Suárez
3	MF	IND	Sukhwinder Singh (to (India) East Bengal)
4	DF	IND	Khelemba Singh (to (India) Shillong Lajong)
5	DF	FRA	Bernard Mendy (to (Cyprus) AEL Limassol)
6	DF	ITA	Alessandro Nesta (Retired)
6	MF	CMR	Eric Djemba-Djemba (to (Indonesia) Bhayangkara Presisi Lampung F.C.)
7	MF	BRA	Elano (to (Brazil) Santos)
8	MF	ESP	Cristian (to (Morocco) Moghreb Tétouan)
9	FW	HAI	Jean-Eudes Maurice (to (Greece) Nea Salamis Famagusta)
10	MF	SWE	Bojan Djordjic
14	FW	COL	Stiven Mendoza (to (Brazil) Corinthians)
13	MF	IND	Denson Devadas (to (India) Goa)
19	DF	IND	Gouramangi Singh (to (India) Pune City)
21	GK	IND	Abhijit Mondal (loan return to (India) East Bengal)
22	GK	IND	Shilton Paul (loan return to (India) Mohun Bagan)
23	DF	ITA	Marco Materazzi (Retired)
24	MF	IND	Jaison Vales (to (India) Salgaocar)
26	MF	IND	Anthony Barbosa
27	DF	FRA	Mikaël Silvestre (Retired)
28	MF	IND	Pappachen Pradeep (loan return to (India) Mumbai)
29	GK	ITA	Francesco Franzese (Retired)

== Pre-season ==
10 September 2015 Friendly	Chennaiyin FC	2-0	Ortana	Italy

22 September 2015 Friendly	Chennaiyin FC	1-2	Gualdo Casacastalda	Italy

24 September 2015 Friendly	Chennaiyin FC	0-2	Unione Sportiva Arezzo	Italy

26 September 2015 Friendly	Chennaiyin FC	4-1	ASD San Donato Tavarnelle	Italy

== Preliminary round ==
=== League table ===
Pos	Team	Pld	W	D	L	GF	GA	GD	Pts	Qualification or relegation
1	Goa	14	7	4	3	29	20	+9	25	Advance to ISL Play-offs
2	Atlético de Kolkata	14	7	2	5	26	17	+9	23	Advance to ISL Play-offs
3	Chennaiyin (C)	14	7	1	6	25	15	+10	22	Advance to ISL Play-offs
4	Delhi Dynamos	14	6	4	4	18	20	−2	22	Advance to ISL Play-offs
5	NorthEast United	14	6	2	6	18	23	−5	20	

Source: Indian Super League standings
Rules for classification: 1) points; 2) goal difference; 3) number of goals scored.
(C) Champions

=== Results summary ===
Overall								Home						Away					
Pld	W	D	L	GF	GA	GD	Pts	W	D	L	GF	GA	GD	W	D	L	GF	GA	GD
14	7	1	6	25	15	+10	22	4	0	3	16	9	+7	3	1	3	9	6	+3

Last updated: 22 November 2015.
Source: Matches

=== Results by round ===
Round	1	2	3	4	5	6	7	8	9	10	11	12	13	14
Ground	H	A	A	A	A	H	A	H	H	A	H	H	H	A
Result	L	L	W	W	L	W	D	L	L	L	W	W	W	W

Updated to match(es) played on 24 November 2015. Source: Matches
A = Away; H = Home; W = Win; D = Draw; L = Loss

=== Matches ===
3 October 2015 1	Chennaiyin	2 – 3	Atlético de Kolkata	Chennai
19:00 IST (UTC+5:30)	Khabra (yellow card) 6'; Jeje 31'; L. Ralte (yellow card) 59'; Elano 89' (pen.) (yellow card) 89'; B. Singh (yellow card) 90+1'	Report	Postiga 13', 70'; Sahni (yellow card) 39'; Valdo 76'; Mondal (yellow card) 84'	Stadium: Jawaharlal Nehru Stadium, Chennai; Attendance: 29,923; Referee: Matt Conger

8 October 2015 2	Delhi Dynamos	1 – 0	Chennaiyin	Delhi
19:00 IST (UTC+5:30)	Z. Ralte (yellow card) 6'; Chicão 8' (pen.); Riise (yellow card) 16'; Mulder (yellow card) 25'	Report	Potenza (yellow card) 12'; L. Ralte (yellow card) 48'	Stadium: Jawaharlal Nehru Stadium; Attendance: 19,453; Referee: Tejas Nagvenkar

11 October 2015 3	Goa	0 – 4	Chennaiyin	Goa
19:00 IST (UTC+5:30)	Moura (yellow card) 30'	Report	Mendoza 10', 63', 75'; Elano 43'; Khabra (yellow card) 49'; Blasi (yellow card) 85'	Stadium: Fatorda Stadium; Attendance: 18,888; Referee: B. Balasubramaniam

16 October 2015 4	Mumbai City	0 – 2	Chennaiyin	Mumbai
19:00 IST (UTC+5:30)	Čmovš (yellow card) 63'	Report	T. Singh (yellow card) 1'; Mendoza 60', 66'	Stadium: DY Patil Stadium; Attendance: 21,321; Referee: Ali Shaban

20 October 2015 5	NorthEast United	2 – 0	Chennaiyin	Guwahati
19:00 IST (UTC+5:30)	Kamara (yellow card) 43'; Bikey (yellow card) 77'; Simão (yellow card) 83' (goal) 90+1' (pen.); Vélez (yellow card) 90+2' (goal) 90+2'	Report	Blasi (yellow card) 28'; Potenza (yellow card) 38'; Khabra (yellow card) 40' (red card) 40'; Mendy (yellow card) 45+1'; Teferra (yellow card) 45+6'; Wadoo (yellow card) 83'; Elano (yellow card) 90'	Stadium: Indira Gandhi Athletic Stadium; Attendance: 19,272; Referee: Melwin D'Costa

24 October 2015 6	Chennaiyin	2 – 1	Pune City	Chennai
19:00 IST (UTC+5:30)	Blasi (yellow card) 2'; Mendy 34'; Mendoza 48'	Report	Ravanan (yellow card) 50'; Uche 75'; Johnson (yellow card) 53'; Lyngdoh (yellow card) 90'	Stadium: Jawaharlal Nehru Stadium; Attendance: 26,821; Referee: David Gantar

31 October 2015 7	Kerala Blasters	1 – 1	Chennaiyin	Kochi
19:00 IST (UTC+5:30)	Dagnall 46'; Perone (red card)	Report	Elano 34'; Wadoo (yellow card) 59'; Mailson (yellow card) 63'	Stadium: Jawaharlal Nehru Stadium; Attendance: 47,852; Referee: David Gantar

5 November 2015 8	Chennaiyin	0 – 2	Goa	Chennai
19:00 IST (UTC+5:30)	Teferra (yellow card) 46'; Mendy (yellow card) 63'; Elano (yellow card) 70'; Wadoo (yellow card) 77'; Khabra (red card) 90'	Report	Sabrosa (yellow card) 16'; Arnolin (yellow card) 61'; Moura 64'; Lucca 78'; Colaco (yellow card) 86'	Stadium: Jawaharlal Nehru Stadium, Chennai; Attendance: 24,205; Referee: Santosh Kumar

11 November 2015 9	Chennaiyin	1 – 2	NorthEast United	Chennai
19:00 IST (UTC+5:30)	Mundampara (yellow card) 23'; Elano 33'; T. Singh (yellow card) 74'; Das (yellow card) 90+1'	Report	López (yellow card) 20'; Kamara 44' (yellow card) 77'; Silas 72'	Stadium: Jawaharlal Nehru Stadium, Chennai; Attendance: 19,773; Referee: Banerjee Pranjal

18 November 2015 10	Atlético de Kolkata	2 – 1	Chennaiyin	Kolkata
19:00 IST (UTC+5:30)	Doutie 45'; Hume 63'; Valdo (yellow card) 90'	Report	Augusto 27'; Potenza (yellow card) 33'; D. Singh (yellow card) 45'; Fikru (yellow card) 80'; Augusto (yellow card) 82'; Pelissari (yellow card) 94'	Stadium: Salt Lake Stadium; Attendance: 35,437; Referee: N.R.Gamini

21 November 2015 11	Chennaiyin	4 – 1	Kerala Blasters	Chennai
19:00 IST (UTC+5:30)	D. Singh 4' (yellow card) 69'; Mendoza 16', 80', 81'; Blasi (yellow card) 89'	Report	Hossain (yellow card) 69'; German 90'	Stadium: Jawaharlal Nehru Stadium, Chennai; Attendance: 20,483; Referee: Pratap Singh

24 November 2015 12	Chennaiyin	4 – 0	Delhi Dynamos	Chennai
19:00 IST (UTC+5:30)	Mendoza (yellow card) 15' (goal) 17'; Pelissari 21'; Jeje 40', 54'; Khabra (yellow card) 60'	Report	Hans Mulder (yellow card) 62'	Stadium: Jawaharlal Nehru Stadium, Chennai; Attendance: 25,531; Referee: Hai Tan

1 December 2015 13	Chennaiyin	3 – 0	Mumbai City	Chennai
19:00 IST (UTC+5:30)	Mendoza 9'; Jeje 17'; Mendy 45' (yellow card) 80'; Blasi (yellow card) 61'; Pelissari (yellow card) 63'	Report	Mawia (yellow card) 39'; Rodrigues (yellow card) 47'	Stadium: Jawaharlal Nehru Stadium, Chennai; Attendance: 12,636; Referee: Tejas Nagvenkar

5 December 2015 14	Pune City	0 – 1	Chennaiyin	Pune
19:00 IST (UTC+5:30)		Report	Elano (yellow card) 57'; Jeje 64'; Wadoo (yellow card) 89'	Stadium: Shree Shiv Chhatrapati Sports Complex; Attendance: 8,136; Referee: B Balasubramniam

== Semi-finals ==
12 December 2015
19:00 IST (UTC+5:30)
Leg 1

Chennaiyin	3 – 0	Atlético de Kolkata
Blasi (yellow card) 37'; Pelissari 38'; Jeje 57'; Mendoza 68'	Report

Shree Shiv Chhatrapati Sports Complex, Pune, Pune
Attendance: 7,965
Referee: Santosh Kumar
16 December 2015
19:00 IST (UTC+5:30)
Leg 2

Atlético de Kolkata	2 – 1	Chennaiyin
Mohanraj (yellow card) 56'; Fernandes (yellow card) 66'; Lekic 22'; Tiri (yellow card) 84'; Hume 87'	Report	Elano (yellow card) 37'; Singh (yellow card) 55'; Fikru 90'

Salt Lake Stadium, Kolkata, Kolkata
Attendance: 68,340
Referee: Yudai Yamamoto

== Finals ==
20 December 2015
19:00 IST (UTC+5:30)
Finals

FC Goa	2 – 3	Chennaiyin
Arnolin (yellow card) 60'; Haokip 58'; Jofre 87' (yellow card) 88'	Report	Wadoo (yellow card) 17'; Pelissari 54'; Thoi Singh (yellow card) 57'; Kattimani 90' (o.g.); Mendoza 90+1' (yellow card) 90+2'

Fatorda Stadium, Goa, Goa
Referee: Yudai Yamamoto

== Squad statistics ==
=== Appearances and goals ===
No.	Pos	Nat	Player	Total		Indian Super League	
No.	Pos	Nat	Player	Apps	Goals	Apps	Goals
1	GK	(India) IND	Karanjit Singh	4	0	4	0
2	DF	(Brazil) BRA	Éder	2	0	1+1	0
5	DF	(France) FRA	Bernard Mendy	13	2	11+2	2
6	MF	(Italy) ITA	Manuele Blasi	12	0	8+4	0
7	MF	(Brazil) BRA	Elano	14	4	11+3	4
8	MF	(India) IND	Godwin Franco	6	0	0+6	0
9	FW	(Ethiopia) ETH	Fikru Teferra	11	1	4+7	1
10	FW	(India) IND	Jayesh Rane	6	0	4+2	0
11	MF	(India) IND	Thoi Singh	15	0	15	0
12	FW	(India) IND	Jeje Lalpekhlua	10	6	9+1	6
14	FW	(Colombia) COL	Stiven Mendoza	15	13	13+2	13
15	DF	(India) IND	Abhishek Das	3	0	2+1	0
17	MF	(India) IND	Balwant Singh	6	0	2+4	0
18	MF	(India) IND	Harmanjot Khabra	12	0	12	0
19	MF	(Brazil) BRA	Raphael Augusto	12	1	10+2	1
20	MF	(Brazil) BRA	Bruno Pelissari	13	2	5+8	2
21	DF	(India) IND	Lalhmangaihsanga	6	0	5+1	0
22	MF	(India) IND	Zakeer Mundampara	5	0	3+2	0
24	GK	(Armenia) ARM	Apoula Edel	12	0	12	0
25	DF	(India) IND	Dhanachandra Singh	11	1	11	1
26	DF	(India) IND	Mehrajuddin Wadoo	13	0	13	0
27	DF	(Brazil) BRA	Mailson Alves	11	0	11	0
31	DF	(Italy) ITA	Alessandro Potenza	11	0	11	0

=== Goal scorers ===
S.No.	Position	Number	Name	Goals
1	FW	14	(Colombia) Stiven Mendoza	13
2	FW	12	(India) Jeje Lalpekhlua	6
3	MF	7	(Brazil) Elano Blumer	4
4	MF	20	(Brazil) Bruno Pelissari	3
5	DF	5	(France) Bernard Mendy	2
6	DF	25	(India) Dhanachandra Singh	1
6	MF	19	(Brazil) Raphael Augusto	1
6	FW	9	(Ethiopia) Fikru Teferra	1
			Total	31

=== Disciplinary record ===
Number	Position	Name	Yellow card	Red card
18	DF	(India) Harmanjot Khabra	4	2
6	MF	(Italy) Manuele Blasi	6	0
7	MF	(Brazil) Elano	5	0
26	DF	(India) Mehrajuddin Wadoo	5	0
31	DF	(Italy) Alessandro Potenza	4	0
5	DF	(France) Bernard Mendy	3	0
9	FW	(Ethiopia) Fikru Teferra	3	0
14	FW	(Colombia) Stiven Mendoza	2	0
20	MF	(Brazil) Bruno Pelissari	2	0
21	DF	(India) Lalhmangaihsanga	2	0
25	DF	(India) Dhanachandra Singh	2	0
15	DF	(India) Abhishek Das	1	0
17	FW	(India) Balwant Singh	1	0
19	MF	(Brazil) Raphael Augusto	1	0
22	MF	(India) Zakeer Mundampara	1	0
27	DF	(Brazil) Mailson	1	0
		Total	44	2
