= 2014 Chennaiyin FC season =

2014 season of Chennaiyin FC

Chennaiyin FC
2014 season
- Head Coach: Marco Materazzi
- Stadium: Jawaharlal Nehru stadium
- ISL: 1st
- Playoffs: Semi-finalist
- Top goalscorer: Elano Blumer (8)
- Highest home attendance: 25,317 vs. Kerala Blasters (16 December)
- Lowest home attendance: 16,567 vs. Mumbai City FC (28 October)
- Average home league attendance: 22,095

The 2014 season was Chennaiyin FC's inaugural season in the first tournament of the newly formed Indian Super League.

== Preview ==
Chennai city was one of the 9 cities that were selected for franchise bidding, when the ISL was founded in 2013. However, on 11 April 2014 it was reported that Chennai's main bidder, a consortium led by Sunil Gavaskar would drop out due to commitments with the Board of Control for Cricket in India. Later, Bangalore franchise was terminated after their owners dropped out following a dispute with the organizers. Initially reports came out that the ISL organizers were looking for bidders for new owners for the Bangalore franchise before it was revealed that Ronnie Screwvala and actor Abhishek Bachchan would together bid for a Chennai team instead of a Bangalore franchise.

== Players ==
=== Squad ===
Note: Flags indicate national team as defined under FIFA eligibility rules; some limited exceptions apply. Players may hold more than one non-FIFA nationality.

No.	Pos.	Nation	Player
22	GK	IND	Shilton Paul
21	GK	IND	Abhijit Mondal
1	GK	FRA	Gennaro Bracigliano
29	GK	ITA	Francesco Franzese
25	DF	IND	Dhanachandra Singh
4	DF	IND	Khelemba Singh
27	DF	FRA	Mikaël Silvestre
23	DF	ITA	Marco Materazzi
6	DF	ITA	Alessandro Nesta
2	DF	COL	Jairo Suárez
18	MF	IND	Harmanjot Khabra
13	MF	IND	Denson Devadas
11	MF	IND	Dane Pereira

No.	Pos.	Nation	Player
26	MF	IND	Anthony Barbosa
28	MF	IND	Pappachen Pradeep
24	MF	IND	Jaison Vales
3	MF	IND	Sukhwinder Singh
8	MF	ESP	Cristian Hidalgo
10	MF	SWE	Bojan Djordjic (Captain)
6	MF	CMR	Eric Djemba-Djemba
20	MF	BRA	Bruno Pelissari
7	MF	BRA	Elano
12	FW	IND	Jeje
16	FW	IND	Jayesh Rane
17	FW	IND	Balwant Singh
9	FW	HAI	Jean-Eudes Maurice
14	FW	COL	Stiven Mendoza

=== Technical staff ===
As of 27 June 2015

Position	Name
Head coach & Manager	(Italy) Marco Materazzi
Assistant coach	(India) Vivek Nagul
Goalkeeping coach	(Italy) Francesco Franzese

== Indian Super League 2014 ==
=== League table ===
Pos	Team	Pld	W	D	L	GF	GA	GD	Pts	Qualification
1	Chennaiyin	14	6	5	3	24	20	+4	23	Advance to ISL Play-offs
2	Goa	14	6	4	4	21	12	+9	22	Advance to ISL Play-offs
3	Atlético de Kolkata (C)	14	4	7	3	16	13	+3	19	Advance to ISL Play-offs
4	Kerala Blasters	14	5	4	5	9	11	−2	19	Advance to ISL Play-offs

Source: Soccerway
Rules for classification: 1) points; 2) goal difference; 3) number of goals scored
(C) Champions

=== Results summary ===
Overall								Home						Away					
Pld	W	D	L	GF	GA	GD	Pts	W	D	L	GF	GA	GD	W	D	L	GF	GA	GD
14	6	5	3	24	20	+4	23	3	3	1	16	11	+5	3	2	2	8	9	−1

Last updated: 1 December 2014.
Source: Matches

=== Results by matchday ===
Round	1	2	3	4	5	6	7	8	9	10	11	12	13	14
Ground	A	H	A	H	H	H	A	A	H	A	A	A	H	H
Result	W	W	L	W	D	D	D	D	W	W	L	W	L	D

Updated to match(es) played on 1 December 2014. Source: Matches
A = Away; H = Home; W = Win; D = Draw; L = Loss

=== Matches ===
15 October 2014 Match 4	Goa	1 – 2	Chennaiyin	Goa, India
19:00 IST	Grégory Arnolin 65'	Report	Balwant Singh 32'; Elano 42'	Stadium: Fatorda Stadium, Fatorda; Attendance: 16,652

21 October 2014 Match 9	Chennaiyin	2 – 1	Kerala Blasters	Chennai, Tamil Nadu, India
19:00 IST	Elano 14'; Bernard Mendy 64'	Report	Iain Hume 50'	Stadium: Jawaharlal Nehru Stadium, Chennai; Attendance: 19,430

25 October 2014 Match 12	Delhi Dynamos	4 – 1	Chennaiyin	New Delhi, India
19:00 IST	Wim Raymaekers 1'; Junker 21'; Herrero 79' (pen.); Marmentini 90'	Report	Elano 69'	Stadium: Jawaharlal Nehru Stadium, Delhi; Attendance: 13,000

28 October 2014 Match 15	Chennaiyin	5 – 1	Mumbai City FC	Chennai, Tamil Nadu, India
19:00 IST	Elano (9 (pen.)), 69'; Jeje Lalpekhlua 26'; John Valencia 41', 44'	Report	Syed Rahim Nabi 87'	Stadium: Jawaharlal Nehru Stadium, Chennai; Attendance: 16,567

4 November 2014 Match 21	Chennaiyin	1 – 1	Atlético de Kolkata	Chennai, Tamil Nadu, India
19:00 IST	Elano (90 +3 (pen.))	Report	Luis García (35 (pen.))	Stadium: Jawaharlal Nehru Stadium, Chennai; Attendance: 24,088

8 November 2014 Match 25	Chennaiyin	2 – 2	NorthEast United FC	Chennai, Tamil Nadu, India
19:00 IST	Elano 25', 78'	Report	Cornell Glen 38'; Koke 85'	Stadium: Jawaharlal Nehru Stadium, Chennai; Attendance: 22,496

11 November 2014 Match 28	FC Pune City	1 – 1	Chennaiyin	Pune, Maharashtra, India
19:00 IST	Kostas Katsouranis 9'	Report	John Valencia 58'	Stadium: Shree Shiv Chhatrapati Sports Complex, Pune; Attendance: 7,243

14 November 2014 Match 31	Atlético de Kolkata	0 – 0	Chennaiyin	Kolkata, West Bengal, India
19:00 IST		Report		Stadium: Salt Lake Stadium, Kolkata; Attendance: 46,288

19 November 2014 Match 36	Chennaiyin	3 – 1	FC Pune City	Chennai, Tamil Nadu, India
19:00 IST	John Valencia 62'; Bruno Pelissari 70'; Jeje Lalpekhlua 90'	Report	Eric Djemba-Djemba (70 (o.g.))	Stadium: Jawaharlal Nehru Stadium, Chennai; Attendance: 23,726

23 November 2014 Match 39	Mumbai City FC	0 – 3	Chennaiyin	Mumbai, Maharashtra, India
19:00 IST		Report	Pelissari 71'; Dhanachandra Singh 81'; Cristian Hidalgo 89'	Stadium: DY Patil Stadium, Mumbai; Attendance: 23,857

27 November 2014 Match 42	NorthEast United FC	3 – 0	Chennaiyin	Guwahati, Assam, India
19:00 IST	Boro 10'; Sambou 21', 23'	Report		Stadium: Indira Gandhi Athletic Stadium, Guwahati; Attendance: 29,894

30 November 2014 Match 45	Kerala Blasters	0 – 1	Chennaiyin	Kochi, Kerala, India
19:00 IST		Report	Pelissari 87'	Stadium: Jawaharlal Nehru Stadium, Kochi; Attendance: 61,323

5 December 2014 Match 50	Chennaiyin	1 – 3	Goa	Chennai, Tamil Nadu, India
19:00 IST	Jean-Eudes Maurice 90'	Report	Romeo Fernandes 23'; André Santos 41'; Miroslav Slepička 62'	Stadium: Jawaharlal Nehru Stadium, Chennai; Attendance: 24,687

9 December 2014 Match 53	Chennaiyin	2 – 2	Delhi Dynamos	Chennai, Tamil Nadu, India
19:00 IST	Bruno Pelissari 16'; Jeje Lalpekhlua 28'	Report	Alessandro Del Piero 53'; Hans Mulder 88'	Stadium: Jawaharlal Nehru Stadium, Chennai; Attendance: 20,446

== Indian Super League finals ==
=== Semi-finals ===
13 December 2014 Leg 1	Kerala Blasters	3–0	Chennaiyin	Kochi, Kerala, India
19:00 IST	Ahmed 27'; Hume 29'; Mathew 90+4'	Report		Stadium: Jawaharlal Nehru Stadium, Kochi; Attendance: 60,900; Referee: Pranjal Banerjee

16 December 2014 Leg 2	Chennaiyin	3–1 (a.e.t.) (3–4 agg.)	Kerala Blasters	Chennai, Tamil Nadu, India
19:00 IST	Silvestre 42'; Jhingan (o.g.); Lalpekhlua 90'	Report	Pearson 117'	Stadium: Jawaharlal Nehru Stadium, Chennai; Attendance: 25,327; Referee: Tejas Nagvenkar
