= 2015 Indian Super League final =

- Event: 2015 Indian Super League
| Goa | Chennaiyin |
| (India) | (India) |
| 2 | 3 |
- Date: 20 December 2015
- Venue: Fatorda Stadium, Goa
- Man of the Match: Jofre Mateu
- Referee: Yudai Yamamoto (Japan)

The 2015 Indian Super League final was a football match between Goa and Chennaiyin who reached the final of 2015 Indian Super League played on 20 December 2015 at the Fatorda Stadium in Goa. Chennayin defeated Goa 3–2 in the match to win the season. it was a spectacular match

== Match ==
Goa defeated Delhi Dynamos 3–1 aggregate and Chennaiyin defeated Atletico De Kolkata 4–2 aggregate in semi-final to reach the final.

The match started and straight into the starting minutes, a chance came for Goa when Jofre Mateu Hit the post. The first half went goalless. Second Half started and in the way, Mendoza went down in the box through a foul from Kattimani, and the penalty was rewarded to Chennaiyan F.C. Initially, the penalty taken by Pellisari was saved, but he scored on the rebound. Goa reacted quickly by a goal through Haokip through an assist from Leo Moura. Then, in the dying minuted Jofre score on the free kick in the 87th minute and it seemed that Goa had won the game. Just after the start, as the players were running inside the penalty box, Wadoo delivered a long ball inside and Kattimani came running to clear it out, but it went back in the net and Chennaiyin found their equaliser through an own goal in the 90th minute. Then straight after the start, Jayesh Rane chipped the ball towards Mendoza, who dribbled 3 players in one run and swapped the ball in the net. Eventually, the game ended with the last shot of Reinaldo who send it out of the park and Chennaiyin lifted the trophy for the first time.

=== Details ===
20 December 2015
19:00 IST (UTC+5:30)

| Goa | 2–3 | Chennaiyin |
|---|---|---|
| Haokip 58'; Jofre 87' | Report | Pelissari 54'; Kattimani 90' (o.g.); Mendoza 90+1' |

Fatorda Stadium, Goa
Attendance: 18,477
Referee: Yudai Yamamoto

| Goa | Chennaiyin |

== See also ==
- 2015 Indian Super League playoffs
