= Catatau =

Catatau is a nickname in Brazil, and may refer to:

- Vivaldo Maria de Souza (born 1962), Brazilian football winger
- Ygor de Oliveira Ferreira (born 1985), Brazilian football winger
