= Harmanjot Singh Khabra =

Indian footballer (born 1988)

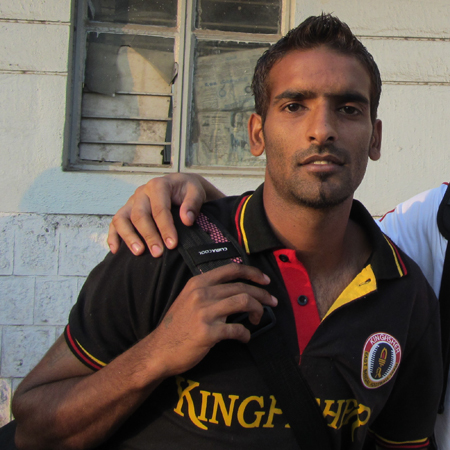
- Khabra in 2011

Personal information
- Full name: Harmanjot Singh Khabra
- Date of birth: 18 March 1988 (age 38)
- Place of birth: Kaharpur, Punjab, India
- Height: 1.76 m (5 ft 9 in)
- Position: Right back

Youth career
- Tata Football Academy

Senior career*
Years	Team	Apps	(Gls)
2006–2009	Sporting Goa	59	(8)
2009–2016	East Bengal	113	(13)
2014–2015	→ Chennaiyin (loan)	28	(0)
2016–2017	Chennaiyin	6	(0)
2017	→ Bengaluru (loan)	14	(1)
2017–2021	Bengaluru	68	(0)
2021–2023	Kerala Blasters	26	(2)
2023–2024	East Bengal	12	(0)
2024–2025	Delhi	5	(0)
2025	Rajasthan United	0	(0)

International career^{‡}
2002–2004	India U16	3	(0)
2007–2008	India U19	3	(0)
2011–2022	India	5	(0)
- * Club domestic league appearances and goals as of 20:48, 2 February 2025 (UTC) ‡ National team caps and goals as of 20:30, 24 September 2022 (UTC)

Harmanjot Singh Khabra (born 18 December 1988) is an Indian professional footballer who plays as a defender.

== Club career ==
=== Youth career ===
As a young player, Khabra began his career at the Tata Football Academy before signing his first professional contract with National Football League (later I-League) club Sporting Clube de Goa.

=== Sporting Goa ===
Khabra began playing for Sporting Clube de Goa in the 2006–07 NFL season. He scored two goals for the team in his debut match against Army XI in the IFA Shield on 19 December 2006. Sporting Goa won 0–4. Sporting Goa progressed through to the final of the Federation Cup that season and met Mohun Bagan on 30 December 2006. Khabra scored Sporting's only goal, but they lost the match in a penalty shoot-out when it ended in a tie after 90 minutes. Khabra had a perfect debut campaign winning the 2006 Durand Cup award for the most promising player of the year. He found the net for the last time for Sporting Goa on 15 November 2008 against East Bengal, in a match that ended 3–1 in East Bengal's favour.

=== East Bengal ===
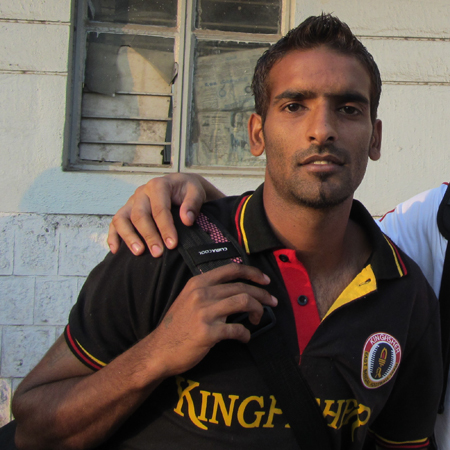
Khabra with East Bengal in 2013

On 30 April 2009, it was announced that Khabra had signed with I-League side East Bengal ahead of the 2009–10 I-League season. Khabra played in the 2009–10 Federation Cup final against Shillong Lajong FC on 3 January 2010. In the penalty shoot-out, Khabra missed his chance, but East Begal won 0–3, when Sanju Pradhan found the net in the last take of the match. Khabra made his continental debut during the 2010 AFC Cup while playing for East Bengal. He played his debut continental match as a substitute for Nirmal Chettri on 10 March 2010 against Al-Ittihad Club, which ended in a 1–4 loss for East Bengal. He was part of the team that won the 2011 Indian Super Cup. He then represented East Bengal once in the 2011 AFC Cup against Persipura Jayapura on 10 May 2011, which drew 1–1 at full-time. Khabra was on the bench for the 2012 IFA Shield final against United SC on 16 March 2012. The match went goalless for 120 minutes. East Bengal emerged champions after winning the penalty shootout 4–2. Khabra also played in the 2012 AFC Cup, where he started his campaign on 6 March 2012 in a 0–1 defeat of Al-Oruba FC. Khabra scored his debut goal for the club on 10 November 2012 against Air India FC, which East Bengal won 0–3 thanks to his brace. In the Kolkata Derby against Mohun Bagan on 9 December, in front of a crowd of 100,000, Khabra scored the opening goal of the match. Unfortunately, the match was abandoned when violence broke out between the spectators. Khabra won his last silverware of the season, when East Bengal defeated Dempo SC in the final of 2012 Federation Cup on 30 September 2012 by a score of 3–2. Khabra was appreciated by pundits and the media for his performance in the 2012–13 season.

After the 2012–13 I-League campaign, he was made captain of the club before the new season. He made his first appearance as captain against Selangor FA on 27 February 2013 in the 2013 AFC Cup, which ended 1–0 to East Bengal. East Bengal went on to play the semi-finals of that AFC Cup season. Khabra featured for them in the first leg of the semi-final on 1 October 2013 against Kuwait SC, which they lost 4–2. He was benched for the second leg on 22 October, which they lost 3–0, resulting in their elimination by an aggregate score of 7–2.

After the AFC Cup, he was back on pitch with East Bengal for the 2013–14 I-League season in the match against Bengaluru FC on 26 October in a 2–0 victory. Khabra was a member of the East Bengal squad that won the 2013–14 Calcutta Premier Division. After the end of the I-League campaign, during the pre-season, Khabra was sent on loan to the newly formed Indian Super League club Chennaiyin FC to take part in the inaugural season of the league, after being selected by the team from the domestic players' draft. At the end of the season, he returned to East Bengal for the 2014–15 I-League season.

Khabra missed the season's early matches because of an injury. After returning, he scored his first goal of the season on 11 April 2015 in a 2–3 victory over Pune FC. He played his first match of the 2015 AFC Cup for East Bengal on 28 April against Johor Darul Ta'zim FC as a substitute for Baljit Sahni, which ended in a 0–1 defeat for East Bengal. After the 2014–15 I-League season, Khabra returned to Chennaiyin FC for his second year as loanee at the club for the 2015 ISL season.

After finishing the 2015 ISL, he returned to East Bengal to play his last season for the club in the 2015–16 I-League season. He played his last match against Shillong Lajong in a 1–0 defeat on 24 April 2016. After the 2015–16 I-League season, having been with the club for seven years, Khabra left for Chennaiyin FC.

=== Chennaiyin FC ===
==== 2014 ISL season: Loan season ====
On 22 July 2014, during the draft of the inaugural season of the Indian Super League, it was announced that Khabra was signed on loan by Team Bengaluru, which would be renamed Chennaiyin FC from East Bengal. He was called by Chennaiyin in the first round. He made his debut for them on 21 October 2014 in the first ever match in the South Indian Derby against Kerala Blasters, where he assisted for Chennaiyin's second goal of the match, which they won 2–1. He played an integral part in the club's progress, as they qualified for the season playoffs, meeting Kerala Blasters in both legs. He started in the first leg on 13 December 2014, which they lost 3–0. Khabra started in the second leg of the semi-final match against Kerala Blasters on 13 December 2014, which many would later call as one of the most dramatic matches in the history of the Indian Super League. Chennai scored three goals in 90 minutes, taking the match to extra time. Khabra, who was injured in the last minutes of the game, was taken off the pitch, and a 117th minute Kerala Blasters goal provided them with the vital goal, as they eliminated the Chennaiyin's chances of entering the final match with an aggregate score of 4–3 from both legs.

==== 2015 ISL season: Maiden ISL trophy ====
When the 2014–15 I-League season concluded, Khabra returned to the club for the 2015 Indian Super League, after the team announced they were retaining him for his second loan year. He made his first appearance of the season against Atlético de Kolkata (later ATK) in a 2–3 defeat on 3 October 2015. In the match between Chennaiyin and NorthEast United FC on 20 October, Khabra saw a red card for misconduct towards the match officials. He was suspended for four matches and was fined 3 lakh rupees for violating article 50 of the All India Football Federation (AIFF) disciplinary code. After his suspension, he returned to the pitch on 5 November in the match against Goa, where he was given a red card for tackling Léo Moura in the 89th minute of the match. Goa won 2–0. Chennaiyin qualified for the finals of the 2015 ISL, after defeating Atlético de Kolkata in the semi-finals with an aggregate score of 4–2. Khabra started in the lineup for the final match against FC Goa, which was held on 20 December. The match ended 2–3 for Chennaiyin after they "snatch[ed] victory from the jaws of defeat". This victory helped Chennaiyin and Khabra to win their first Indian Super League trophy.

==== 2016 ISL season: Signing permanent contract and final season ====
Chennaiyin signed Khabra, and Raphael Augusto on a permanent deal after the 2015 ISL campaign. Khabra made his first appearance in the match against FC Goa on 13 October 2016 in a 2–0 victory as a substitute for Raphael Augusto. Khabra played his last match for Chennaiyin on 1 December against FC Goa in the second match against them that season, which ended 5–4 to Goa. This match was not only the last match for Khabra, but it was also the highest scoring match in the history of the Indian Super League, until the match between Kerala Blasters and Chennaiyin in 2020. After leaving Chennaiyin FC, Khabra signed for I-League side Bengaluru FC.

=== Bengaluru FC ===
==== 2017: Loan season ====
On 12 December 2016, it was announced that Khabra was signed by I-League side Bengaluru FC for the rest of the season. He made his debut for the club on 7 January 2017 against Shillong Lajong in a 3–0 victory. He made his first continental appearance for them in the 2017 AFC Champions League preliminary round 2 match against Al-Wehdat SC on 31 January in a 2–1 defeat. Khabra played first at the 2017 AFC Cup against Maziya S&RC on 4 April 2017 as a substitute for Sandesh Jhingan, which ended in a 0–1 win for Bengaluru. Khabra scored his debut goal for the club against Shillong Lajong in the second match of the season against them on 15 April, which ended 0–2 for Bengaluru after Khabra found the net.

==== 2017–18: Signing permanent contract ====
After the 2016–17 I-League season, Bengaluru shifted from the I-League to the Indian Super League as one of two new entrants in the league. On 4 April 2018, it was announced that Khabra had signed a three-year contract ending in May 2021. He played his first game of the season in a 2–0 victory over Mumbai City FC on 19 November 2017, in Bengaluru's first match in the Indian Super League. Khabra made his first appearance in the 2018 AFC Cup qualifying play-offs in the preliminary qualifying match against Transport United FC on 30 January 2018, which ended 3–0 for Bengaluru. Bengaluru had an influential campaign, as they qualified for the finals of the 2017–18 ISL season. Khabra did not play the final match against his former club Chennaiyin on 17 March 2018, 2–3 loss. In the same season, Bengaluru qualified for the final of the 2018 Indian Super Cup, and defeated his former club East Bengal in the final on 20 April with a score of 1–4. Khabra was benched for the match, but the club's victory helped him win his first trophy, and Bengaluru became the first ever champion of the Indian Super Cup.

==== 2018–19: Second ISL victory ====
After missing the last matches of the previous ISL season, Khabra was back in action for Bengaluru in the 2018–19 Indian Super League in their opening match on 20 September 2018 against Chennaiyin in a 1–0 victory. Khabra assisted twice in the match against FC Pune City on 30 November 2018, which helped Bengaluru to win the match 2–1. He completed three assists. Bengaluru qualified for the final for the second consecutive year meeting FC Goa in the match. Khabra started in the lineup for the final against Goa on 17 March 2019, which they ended up winning 1–0 after 120 minutes when a late goal decided the match for Bengaluru. This victory helped Khabra clinch his second ISL trophy and Bengaluru win their maiden ISL trophy.

==== 2019–20: Third consecutive playoffs ====
Khabra started his 2019–20 Indian Super League on 21 October 2019 in their opening match of the season in a 0–0 draw against NorthEast United. Bengaluru qualified for the 2019–20 ISL season playoffs but failed to make it to the finals after they were brought down by ATK (former Atlético de Kolkata) with an aggregate score of 3–2. Khabra ended his season with no goals or assists. In between the ISL season, he played in the 2020 AFC Cup qualifying play-offs by appearing for the club first in the second preliminary round match against Paro FC in the first leg on 5 February 2020, which they won 0–1.

==== 2020–21: 100th appearance and final season ====
Khabra was back with the team for the 2020–21 Indian Super League, which was played behind closed doors because of the COVID-19 pandemic. He played his first game of the season on 22 November 2020 in Bengaluru's opening match against Goa, which ended in a 2–2 draw. He provided three assists for the club in a devastating campaign. Khabra made his 100th appearance for the Blues in the match against Jamshedpur FC on 28 December, which they lost 0–1. He played his only match in the 2021 AFC Cup qualifying play-offs against the Nepal Army Club in the preliminary round 2 match on 14 April 2021, which they won 5–0. On 30 May 2021, it was officially announced that Khabra had left after spending five years with the club.

=== Kerala Blasters FC ===
==== 2021–22: Debut season and ISL runner-up ====
On 15 July 2021, Khabra signed a two-year deal with Indian Super League club Kerala Blasters, the southern rivals of his previous club ahead of the 2021–22 Indian Super League. He made his debut for the club on 11 September 2021 against Indian Navy in the 2021 Durand Cup, which they won 1–0. He made his league debut with the Blasters on 19 November in the 2021–22 Indian Super League season opener against ATK Mohun Bagan FC, which they lost 4–2 at full-time. Khabra played the derby match against his former club Bengaluru on 28 November, where he was named man of the match, after the match ended in a 1–1 draw. He suffered a muscle tweak in the training session prior to the match against his former club East Bengal on 12 December, and was omitted from the squad for the game. He returned to the pitch on 19 December for the match against defending champions Mumbai City on 19 November, which they won 0–3. Khabra scored his debut goal and his first-ever goal in the Indian Super League on 12 January 2022 in the match against Odisha FC, which they won 0–2 after Khabra scored the second goal for the club in the 40th minute of the game. During the post-match conference, he was then awarded with the man-of-the match award. He captained the Blasters side for the first time on 30 January in their 0–1 defeat over his former club Bengaluru. In the Blasters 3–0 victory against his former club Chennaiyin on 26 February, he became the second player in the Indian Super League history, behind Narayan Das, to have played 10,000 minutes in the league. Khabra was handed a two-match ban and a fine of ₹1.5 lakh by the All India Football Federation Disciplinary Committee, after he was charged with 'violent conduct' in the Indian Super League match against Hyderabad FC in February.

==== 2022–23: Game time reduction and departure ====
After an impressive first season, Khabra made his first appearance of the season against his former club East Bengal in the opening match of the season on 7 October 2022, which they won 3–1 at home. Khabra provided the assist from the half-way line to set up the first goal of the match scored by Adrián Luna. He scored his first goal of the season on 23 October against Odisha, where he scored a header in the 35th minute but the Blasters lost the match 2–1 at full-time. Since October, Khabra made only three more appearances for the club throughout the season and made played his last match of the season against East Bengal in the returning fixture on 3 February 2023, which they lost 1–0. After the ISL campaign with Blasters, Khabra was missed out on a place in their squad to take part in the 2023 Indian Super Cup season. After the end of the football season on 31 May, the Blasters announced the Khabra has left the club following the expiry of his contract on the same day.

=== Return To East Bengal ===
==== 2023–24: Returning after seven-years ====
After his tenure with the Kerala Blasters, on 21 June 2023, Khabra was re-signed by East Bengal as a free agent after seven years since his departure in 2016 ahead of the 2023–24 season. He made his return at 2023 Durand Cup captaining the side in a 2–2 draw against Bangladesh Army Football Team, providing an assist to Javier Siverio's goal.

== International career ==
=== Youth ===
In 2004, Khabra was called up for the India U16 squad to play in the 2004 AFC U-17 Championship in Japan, where he played in the matches against Iran, Kuwait and Malaysia in the group stage. In 2006, he was included on the India U19 team to play against China, Bangladesh and Myanmar in Myanmar.

=== Senior ===
In 2011, Khabra got his maiden call-up for the senior national team. He made his senior team debut as a substitute in a friendly match on 10 July 2011 against Maldives, which ended in a 1–1 draw. In India's match against Qatar on 17 July, Khabra started a substitute and assisted on Sushil Kumar Singh's goal, which helped India to win the match 1–2 at full-time. He was selected for the Indian squad to take part in the 2014 FIFA World Cup qualifiers. He did not play any matches but was included on the bench for the match against the United Arab Emirates on 28 July, which ended in a 2–2 tie. After being named as one of the 28 Indian probables, he was selected for the 25-member Indian squad to compete in the 2018 FIFA World Cup qualifiers. He played his first match of the competition on 12 November 2015 in a 1–0 win over Guam as a substitute for Romeo Fernandes. He appeared in the match against Iran on 24 March 2016 as a substitute for Bikash Jairu, which India lost 4–0. After being not a part of the national team squad for more than five years, Khabra made his return to the national team in May 2022 when he was included in the 25-member squad for a friendly match against Jordan. He remained in the bench as an unused substitute. On 20 September 2022, Khabra was named in India's squad for the Hung Tinh Friendly football tournament in Vietnam. On 24 September 2022, Khabra made his first appearance for India since 2016 by coming as a substitute for Naorem Roshan Singh in the 68th minute in a 1–1 draw against Singapore.

== Style of play ==
Khabra is appreciated by fans and coaches for his versatility on the pitch. Generally deployed as a central midfielder, he can also play as a right-back and can play in any defensive positions when needed. He can also play as a defensive midfielder and at the right side of the midfield. In his youth, Khabra played in the striker in position. According to some coaches, he is not a technically gifted player but is physically strong and is good at tackles and interception. He played an integral part in Bengaluru's success between 2017 and 2021, and is among the few players to have won ISL with two different clubs.

== Personal life ==
Khabra was born on 18 December 1988 in Kaharpur in the Indian state of Punjab. He was a street-football player, until he started his youth career.

== Career statistics ==
=== Club ===
As of matches played till 1 June 2024

Club	Season	League			Cup (Note: Appearances in Federation Cup/Super Cup)		Continental (Note: Appearances in AFC Cup)		Other		Total	
Club	Season	Division	Apps	Goals	Apps	Goals	Apps	Goals	Apps	Goals	Apps	Goals
Sporting Goa	2006–07	National Football League	59	11	1	1	—	—	1 (Note: One appearance in an IFA Shield match)	2 (Note: Goals in an IFA Shield match)	61	14
Sporting Goa	2007–08	I-League	59	11	—	—	—	—	—	—	61	14
Sporting Goa	2008–09	I-League	59	11	—	—	—	—	—	—	61	14
Sporting Goa	Sporting Goa total		59	11	1	1	—	—	1	2	61	14
East Bengal	2009–10	I-League	20	0	8 (Note: 4 appearances in the Federation Cup, 2 appearances in the Durand Cup and 2 appearances in the IFA Shield.)	0	5	0	13 (Note: 11 appearances in the Calcutta Football League and 2 appearances in the E.K. Nayanar Gold Cup.)	0	46	0
East Bengal	2010–11	I-League	10	0	8 (Note: 5 appearances in the Federation Cup and 3 appearances in the Durand Cup.)	0	1	0	11 (Note: Appearances in the Calcutta Football League.)	2	30	2
East Bengal	2011–12	I-League	21	0	7 (Note: 5 appearances in the Federation Cup and 2 appearances in the IFA Shield.)	0	3	0	6 (Note: 5 appearances in the Calcutta Football League and 1 appearance in the BTV Cup.)	0	37	0
East Bengal	2012–13	I-League	16	3	9 (Note: 4 appearances in the Federation Cup and 5 appearances in the IFA Shield.)	0	5	0	5	2	35	5
East Bengal	2013–14	I-League	21	0	4 (Note: 2 appearances in the Federation Cup and 2 appearances in the IFA Shield.)	0	1	0	9	2	35	2
East Bengal	2014–15	I-League	18	1	2 (Note: 2 appearances in the Federation Cup.)	0	5	0	3	1	28	2
East Bengal	2015–16	I-League	7	0	2	0	0	0	8	2	17	2
East Bengal	East Bengal total		113	4	40	0	20	0	55	9	228	13
Chennaiyin (loan)	2014	Indian Super League	15	0	—	—	—	—	—	—	15	0
Chennaiyin (loan)	2015	Indian Super League	13	0	—	—	—	—	—	—	13	0
Chennaiyin	2016	Indian Super League	6	0	—	—	—	—	—	—	6	0
Chennaiyin	Chennaiyin total		34	0	—	—	—	—	—	—	34	0
Bengaluru (loan)	2017	I-League	14	1	—	—	10 (Note: One appearance in 2017 AFC Champions League qualifying play-offs and nine appearances in 2017 AFC Cup)	0	—	—	24	1
Bengaluru	2017–18	Indian Super League	13	0	1	0	6	0	—	—	20	0
Bengaluru	2018–19	Indian Super League	20	0	1	0	—	—	—	—	21	0
Bengaluru	2019–20	Indian Super League	19	0	—	—	3	0	—	—	22	0
Bengaluru	2020–21	Indian Super League	16	0	—	—	1	0	—	—	17	0
Bengaluru	Bengaluru total		82	1	2	0	20	0	—	—	104	1
Kerala Blasters	2021–22	Indian Super League	19	1	—	—	—	—	2	0	21	0
Kerala Blasters	2022–23	Indian Super League	7	1	—	—	—	—	0	0	7	1
Kerala Blasters	Kerala Blasters total		26	2	—	—	—	—	2	0	104	1
East Bengal	2023–24	Indian Super League	12	0	6 (Note: 6 Appearances in the Durand Cup.)	0	—	—	—	—	18	0
East Bengal	2024–25	Indian Super League	0	0	0	0	0	0	0	0	0	0
East Bengal	Kerala Blasters total		12	0	6	0	0	0	0	0	18	0
Career total			326	18	49	1	40	0	58	11	473	30

=== International ===
As of matches played till 24 September 2022

National team	Year	Apps	Goals
India	2011	2	0
India	2015	1	0
India	2016	1	0
India	2022	1	0
Total		5	0

== Honours ==
=== Club ===
==== Chennaiyin FC ====
- Indian Super League: 2015

==== East Bengal FC ====
- Federation Cup: 2009–10, 2010, 2012
- Calcutta Football League: 2010, 2011, 2012, 2013, 2014, 2015, 2016
- IFA Shield: 2012
- Indian Super Cup: 2011

==== Bengaluru FC ====
- Indian Super League: 2018–19
- Super Cup: 2018

==== Kerala Blasters FC ====
- Indian Super League runner up: 2021–22.

Sporting positions
Preceded by Mehtab Hossain	Kingfisher East Bengal; Captain; 2014–2015	Succeeded by Arnab Mondal
