= Gioffre =

Gioffre is a given name and surname. Notable people with the name include:

- Anthony B. Gioffre (1907–1996), American lawyer and politician
- Gioffre Borgia (c. 1481–c. 1516), Italian noble, illegitimate son of Pope Alexander VI and brother of Lucrezia and Cesare Borgia
- Gioffré (drag queen), Italian drag queen

== See also ==
- Jofre (name)
