= Oscar Jofre =

Canadian entrepreneur and technology specialist (born 1965)

Oscar A. Jofre Jr.
- Born: October 20, 1965 (age 60); Santiago, Chile
- Occupations: Entrepreneur, technology specialist

Oscar A. Jofre Jr. (born October 20, 1965) is a Chilean-born Canadian entrepreneur and technology specialist. He founded The BabelFish Corporation, based in Ottawa, in January 1999. The company specializes in providing a Software as a Service (SaaS)-based multilingual translation portal.

== Background ==
In 1996, Jofre had a role in co-founding the Canadian Network of Language Industries Network (CLIN-RCIL) and served on its Sectoral Committee. His involvement in CLIN-RCIL's Sectoral Committee was in response to a government mandate to foster collaboration within the language industry.

From 2002 to 2003, Jofre served on the steering committee of the Language Industry Technology Roadmap (LITR). This initiative, driven by Industry Canada and the National Research Council of Canada, aimed to identify industry stakeholders, analyze growth sectors, evaluate Canadian research, and propose measures to ensure international leadership. During the same period, Jofre was the sole Canadian representative on the United Nations/MIT Digital Nations Board (1999–2002), which initially explored the potential of Esperanto.

In 2003, Jofre founded another company, BoardSuite, a SaaS-based, secure web application-collaborative platform commonly referred to as a board portal, which stores and manages board documents, and addresses board issues having to do with compliance and transparent governance.

Jofre then partnered with Jason Futko in 2016 to establish KoreConX, a platform designed to assist companies in managing their capital market activities and communicating with stakeholders.
