= Catatau (footballer) =

Brazilian footballer (born 1962)

Personal information
- Full name: Vivaldo Maria de Souza
- Date of birth: 26 July 1962 (age 64)
- Place of birth: Paracatu, Brazil
- Height: 1.70 m (5 ft 7 in)
- Position: Right winger

Youth career
- Ideal (Sete Lagoas)

Senior career*
| Years | Team | Apps | (Gls) |
| 1982 | Guarani-MG | | |
| 1982–1986 | Atlético Mineiro | 137 | (14) |
| 1985 | → Avaí (loan) | | |
| 1986–1987 | Guarani | | |
| 1988–1989 | Portuguesa | 68 | (9) |
| 1990 | Internacional | 5 | (1) |
| 1990 | Vitória | | |
| 1991 | Marília | | |
| 1992 | Sãocarlense | | |
| 1993 | Marília | | |
| 1993 | CRB | | |
| 1994 | Ceará | | |
| 1994 | Marília | | |
| 1995 | Ferroviária | | |
- * Club domestic league appearances and goals as of 26 May 2024

Vivaldo Maria de Souza (born 26 July 1962), better known as Catatau, is a Brazilian former professional footballer who played as a right winger.

== Career ==
Revealed at Guarani de Divinópolis, Catatau played for Atlético Mineiro from 1982 to 1986, making 137 appearances and being state champion three times. He later transferred to Guarani FC, and was Brazilian runner-up in 1986 and 1987. He played for several other clubs, notably CRB, where he scored the state title goal in 1993.

== Style of play ==
Catatau had the reputation of not knowing how to finish with precision, but he stood out for his physical resistance, receiving the nickname "secretary" for assisting in defensive system.

== Personal life ==
Catatau is father of the footvolley player Vinícius. He is currently a businessman in Campinas.

== Honours ==
Atlético Mineiro

- Campeonato Mineiro: 1982, 1983, 1986
- Taça Minas Gerais: 1986
- Tournoi de Paris: 1982

CRB

- Campeonato Alagoano: 1993
