= Vinícius (footballer, born December 1988) =

Brazilian footballer

Personal information
- Full name: Vinícius Ferreira de Souza
- Date of birth: 2 December 1988 (age 37)
- Place of birth: Campinas, Brazil
- Height: 1.69 m (5 ft 6 1/2 in)
- Position: Attacking midfielder

Youth career
- Ceará

Senior career*
Years	Team	Apps	(Gls)
2015–2016	Delhi Dynamos	11	(0)
- * Club domestic league appearances and goals as of 10:21, 28 May 2016 (UTC)

Vinícius Ferreira de Souza (born 2 December 1988) is a Brazilian footballer and former football player who plays for Indian club Delhi Dynamos as an attacking midfielder.

== Career ==
Born in Campinas, São Paulo, Vinícius moved to Fortaleza, Ceará at early age and was a Ceará SC youth player, but moved on to footvolley in 2008. With the latter sport he was considered one of the best players worldwide, along with his partner Bello, and was crowned champions of more than 30 championships.

On 30 September 2015 Vinícius was drafted by Indian Super League side Delhi Dynamos FC, after being recommended by compatriot Roberto Carlos. He made his professional debut on 4 October, starting in a 0–2 away loss against FC Goa.

== Personal life ==
Vinícius is son of the former footballer Catatau.
