= Mikaël Silvestre =

French footballer (born 1977)

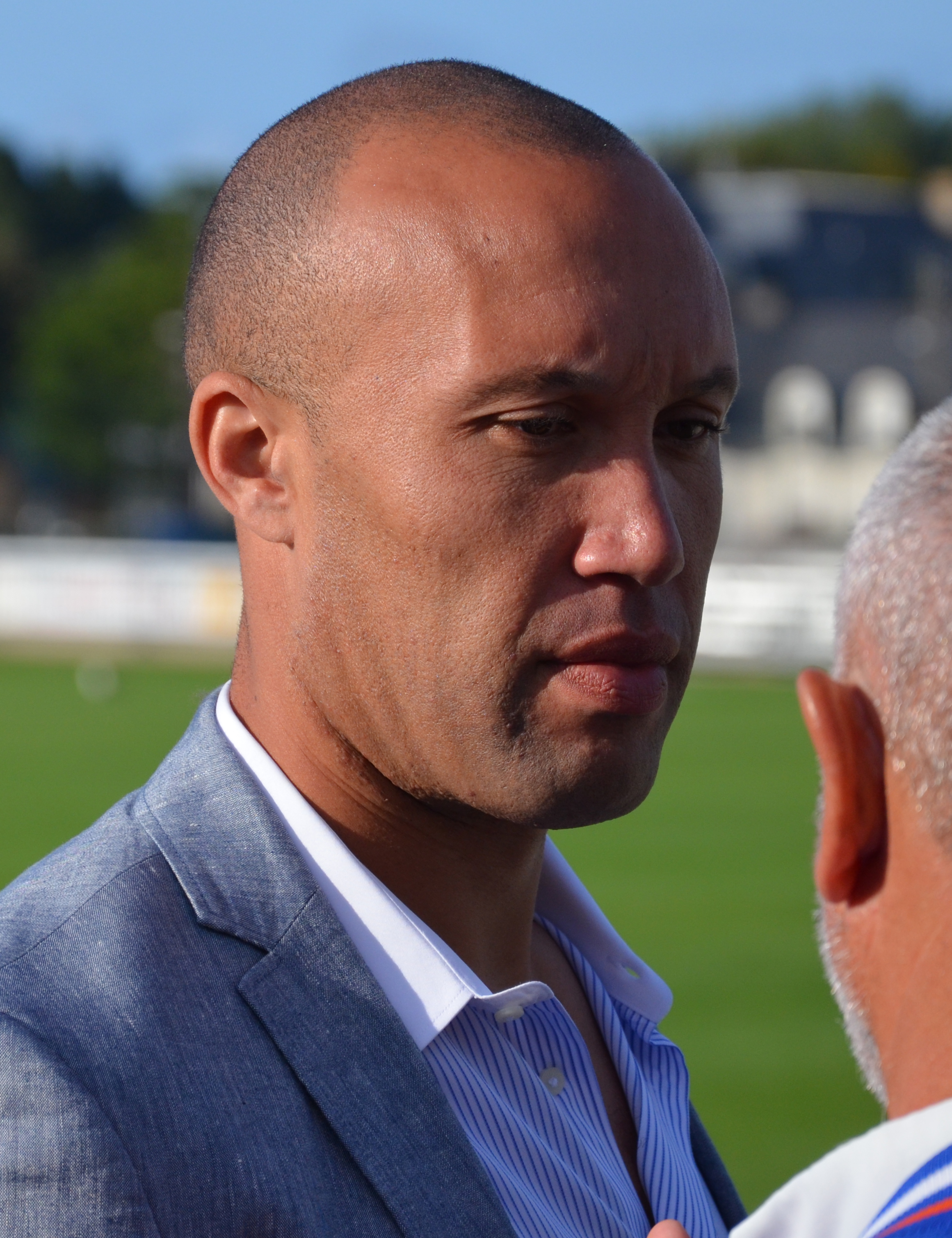
- Silvestre in 2015

Personal information
- Full name: Mikaël Samy Silvestre
- Date of birth: 9 August 1977 (age 49)
- Place of birth: Chambray-lès-Tours, France
- Height: 1.83 m (6 ft 0 in)
- Position: Defender

Senior career*
Years	Team	Apps	(Gls)
1996–1998	Rennes	55	(0)
1998–1999	Inter Milan	18	(1)
1999–2008	Manchester United	249	(6)
2008–2010	Arsenal	26	(3)
2010–2012	Werder Bremen	27	(1)
2013–2014	Portland Timbers	8	(0)
2014	Chennaiyin	14	(1)
Total		391	(12)

International career
1997	France U20	5	(0)
2001–2006	France	40	(2)
Medal record
Men's football
Representing France
FIFA Confederations Cup
Winner	2001
Winner	2003
FIFA World Cup
Runner-up	2006
- * Club domestic league appearances and goals

Mikaël Samy Silvestre (born 9 August 1977) is a French former professional footballer who played as a defender. He is best known for a nine-year spell at Manchester United, with whom he won multiple Premier League titles, the FA Cup, the Football League Cup, two FA Community Shields, the Intercontinental Cup and the UEFA Champions League.

Silvestre began his career at Rennes in 1996, before moving to Italian club Inter Milan in 1998. He joined Manchester United in 1999, where he won multiple Premier League titles and the UEFA Champions League in his final season at the club in 2008. He then joined Arsenal, followed by a move to German side Werder Bremen two years later. After a further two years in Germany, he moved to the United States to play for Portland Timbers in Major League Soccer, before signing for Indian Super League side Chennaiyin in 2014, where he retired at the end of the season.

Silvestre has also played for the France national team, earning 40 caps between 2001 and 2006. He was part of the France team that won the FIFA Confederations Cup in 2001 and 2003. Silvestre also represented his country at UEFA Euro 2004, as well as two FIFA World Cups in 2002 and 2006, winning a runners-up medal at the latter.

== Early life ==
Silvestre was born in Chambray-lès-Tours, Indre-et-Loire.

== Club career ==
=== Early career ===
Silvestre started playing football with the Rennes Football Academy in Brittany and began his league career with the French club in the 1995–96 season. His time at the club helped build his reputation, and in the 1997–98 season was signed by Inter Milan. He made 31 appearances for Inter in Serie A, Coppa Italia and in the UEFA Champions League.

=== Manchester United ===
Despite an approach from Liverpool manager Gérard Houllier, Silvestre signed for Manchester United for £4 million on 10 September 1999, and made his debut against Liverpool at Anfield the next day. In his first season at Manchester United he replaced an injured Ronny Johnsen in the centre of defence with Jaap Stam; By the 2001–02 season, Silvestre had established himself in defence ahead of the veteran Denis Irwin, and was proving to be adept both in defence and in getting forward at left back. He set up numerous goals for Ruud van Nistelrooy, notably away to Deportivo La Coruña in a 2–0 towards the end of the season.

During the next season, he carried on initially where he left off at the left of Manchester United's back four, but following injury to Rio Ferdinand and the poor performance of an ageing Laurent Blanc, he was switched to his favoured position of central defence. This first happened at half-time in the UEFA Champions League match away in Basel on 26 November 2002 when the team were 1–0 down and struggling with a young John O'Shea looking shaky at the heart of the defence. Silvestre and O'Shea were switched for the second half and the team immediately looked more solid defensively. From this point on, Silvestre forged a successful partnership mid-season with Wes Brown at the heart of the defence until Ferdinand's return, looking calm and assured. Using his pace to good effect, while continuing to provide goals with his accurate diagonal balls.

The beginning of the 2003–04 season saw Silvestre paired with Ferdinand in the centre of the team's defence. However, this was cut short following Ferdinand's eight-month ban for missing a drug test. In the latter half of this season, when being paired with an unfit Wes Brown, Manchester United's defence proved to be rather less secure and both Brown and Silvestre were at fault for numerous goals and despite winning the FA Cup with a 3–0 victory over Millwall, this uncertainty at the heart of the defence was to continue into the start of the 2004–05 season.

Competition for places grew significantly during the January transfer window in 2006 with the signings of Nemanja Vidić and Patrice Evra. Although both struggled to adapt initially, both went on to establish themselves as firm fan favourites and key members of the Manchester United squad. Following the partnership of Vidić and Ferdinand at the heart of the defence, and Evra's holding of the left-back position, Silvestre found it more difficult to secure a place in the Manchester United starting line-up. However, his form improved toward the end of the season. He admitted that he was given the option to leave during the January transfer window during 2006, with an opportunity to join former Liverpool manager Gérard Houllier at Lyon. He did however decide to stay and fight for his place at United.

On 11 August 2006, his loyalty to the club was rewarded with a new contract extending his stay at the club until at least 2009. Alex Ferguson commented: "Mikael has been an important member of the squad for seven years now. His experience at the club will help the younger players as they develop and he has a central role to play in the first team."

He started the 2006–07 season against Watford, scoring a goal, his first away goal for United, to give United the lead. He was starting to reassert himself in the left-back role when he broke a metatarsal in a 1–0 defeat to Arsenal. After recovering and playing several games, he dislocated his shoulder in a Champions League win against Lille, meaning he was unable to play for the rest of the season. He did, however, win his fourth Premier League winner's medal that season as United won the league for the first time since 2003.

With Gabriel Heinze moving to Real Madrid, Silvestre was set to battle Evra for the starting left-back spot in the first eleven at Manchester United in the 2007–08 season. On 15 September, however, Silvestre was stretchered off with knee ligament damage that would rule him out for the rest of the season. On 24 September, Ferguson revealed that: "I'm sure Mikael will be back in March." He also said that "we had him operated on in France last week and it all went well. It was pleasing to see there was no further damage other than the cruciate ligament. That's a big bonus because sometimes there can be cartilage problems that also come along."

On 20 March, Silvestre made his comeback in the Manchester United reserves in a 4–1 win over Manchester City.

On 9 April 2008, Silvestre made his first start for seven months in a Champions League quarter-final match versus Roma.

A transfer to Bordeaux was mooted in the summer of 2008. However, it is believed that Silvestre turned the transfer down to see out the remaining year of his contract, and potentially receive a testimonial match at the end of the 2008–09 season. He received an offer to join Manchester City from manager Mark Hughes and was set to join them; however, during the medical examination, Arsenal manager Arsène Wenger called to offer Silvestre a transfer to his club. Given the strong French presence at Arsenal, the rivalry between Manchester United and Manchester City, and the fact that Manchester City were not yet a force in English football, Silvestre opted to join the London club.

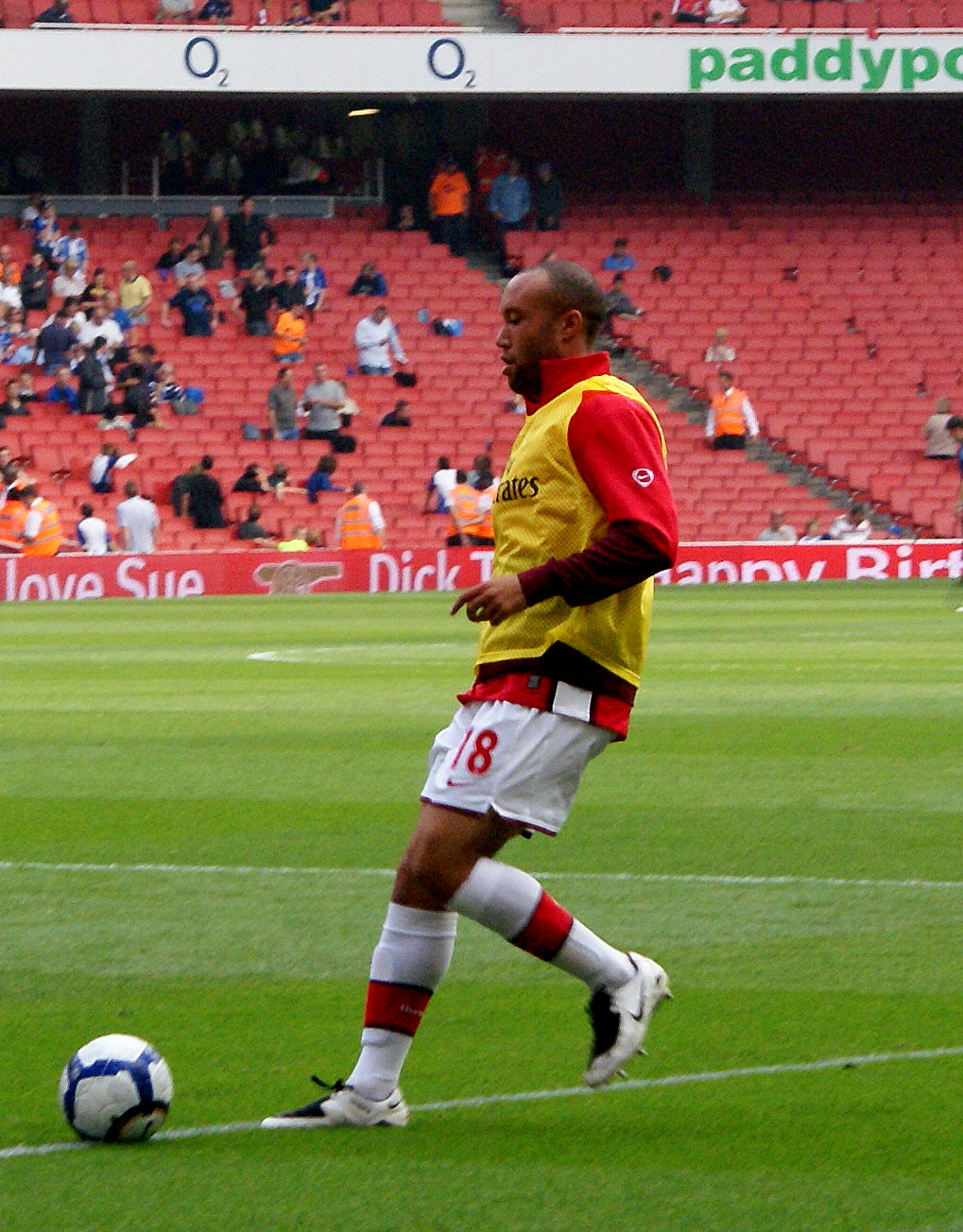
Silvestre warming up before an Arsenal match

=== Arsenal ===
The transfer to Arsenal was completed for an undisclosed fee on 20 August 2008, with Silvestre signing a two-year contract. The transfer made Silvestre the first player to transfer directly between Manchester United and Arsenal since Viv Anderson (who moved in the opposite direction) in 1987, and the first player to move from United to Arsenal since Brian Kidd in 1974. He was given the number 18 shirt, last worn by Pascal Cygan. Silvestre made his debut for the club in a 3–1 victory over Everton on 18 October 2008, his 250th game in English football. In his first Champions League game for Arsenal, against Turkish side Fenerbahçe, he scored an own goal as Arsenal won 5–2. His first Premiership goal for Arsenal came against Tottenham Hotspur on 29 October 2008 in a 4–4 draw. On 8 November 2008, Silvestre played his first game against former side Manchester United, in a fixture that Arsenal eventually won 2–1. Silvestre was as well part of the squad, where he played in the first leg, for Arsenal's 2009 Champions League semi final also against that of Manchester United.

=== Werder Bremen ===
After the 2009–10 season, Silvestre was released by Arsenal and became a free agent. He reportedly had offers from Fulham and Kayserispor, but instead signed for Werder Bremen. He managed to score his first goal for Bremen, in a magnificent shot which Bremen won against Bundesliga champions Borussia Dortmund 2–0. By the end of the season, he made 26 league appearances, scoring a single league goal. He was released at the end of the 2011–12 season. He was offered a trial at English club West Ham United in September 2012. In October 2012, Silvestre began training with his former club, Manchester United, in order to maintain his fitness in the hope of finding a new club. Since then, he received an offer from Indian club Dodsal, with a view to joining them in time for their new season in January 2013.

=== Portland Timbers ===
Silvestre spent time on trial with MLS side Portland Timbers ahead of the 2013 MLS campaign, and then moved to trial with fellow Cascadia region MLS side Seattle Sounders. The Timbers obtained Silvestre's MLS discovery rights from the Sounders in exchange for a first-round pick in the 2014 MLS Supplemental Draft and a conditional 2015 draft pick. On 19 February 2013, it was announced that Silvestre had signed a two-year deal with Portland.

On 2 May 2013 Silvestre tore his left anterior cruciate ligament (ACL) in a game against the New England Revolution. He missed the rest of the season. Silvestre subsequently had surgery to repair the damage. Despite his injury, Silvestre remained a vocal and engaged member of the team off the field and on social media.

Silvestre was released by Portland on 28 January 2014.

=== Chennaiyin ===
On 20 September 2014, Silvestre joined newly formed Indian Super League side Chennaiyin for four months and his signing was confirmed through Prashant Agarwal CEO of Kshatriya Sports, who confirmed that Silvestre signed the contract for the season for more than $500,000 (USD). He started in their first match on 15 October 2014, a 2–1 victory against Goa.

At the end of the season, after playing 14 games for Chennaiyin, Silvestre announced that would be exploring options to extend his playing career in the Middle-East and if not, he would continue working on his coaching badges, meaning that his time at Chennaiyin was over.

== International career ==
Silvestre was previously a member of French junior team at the 1997 FIFA World Youth Championship. He earned his first senior cap for France on 27 February 2001 in a friendly against Germany that ended in a 1–0 win. He won the Confederations Cup both in 2001 and 2003 with France.

Silvestre also played one game in the French squad that made the final of the 2006 FIFA World Cup, but did not play again for the national team after the tournament. He was recalled to the squad by Raymond Domenech for the 19 November 2008 friendly against Uruguay, but was an unused substitute. Raymond Domenech said he was in contention for a place at the 2010 World Cup, but he did not get a place. Silvestre was in the squad for a friendly against Romania in 2011, but again was an unused substitute.

== Style of play ==
A versatile defender, Silvestre was capable of playing both as a left-sided full-back and as a centre-back. He was mainly known for his pace and stamina, although he also possessed good distribution and was known for being comfortable on the ball.

== After retirement ==
Upon retiring, Silvestre took up a director of football role with former club Rennes in July 2015. He left by mutual consent on 22 December 2016. On 15 December 2021, backed by esports organisation Galaxy Racer, Silvestre launched Talent Lyfe, an agency to represent athletes and young talent in sports.

== Personal life ==
Silvestre's father, Franck, is from Guadeloupe.

== Career statistics ==
=== Club ===
Appearances and goals by club, season and competition
Club	Season	League			National cup (Note: Includes Coupe de France, Coppa Italia, FA Cup, DFB-Pokal)		League cup (Note: Includes Coupe de la Ligue, Football League Cup)		Continental (Note: All appearances in UEFA Champions League)		Other		Total	
Club	Season	Division	Apps	Goals	Apps	Goals	Apps	Goals	Apps	Goals	Apps	Goals	Apps	Goals
Rennes	1995–96	French Division 1	1	0	0	0	0	0	–		–		1	0
Rennes	1996–97	French Division 1	16	0	1	0	1	0	–		–		18	0
Rennes	1997–98	French Division 1	32	0	2	0	1	0	–		–		35	0
Rennes	Total		49	0	3	0	2	0	–		–		54	0
Inter Milan	1998–99	Serie A	18	1	7	0	–		6	0	–		31	1
Manchester United	1999–2000	Premier League	31	0	–		0	0	4	0	3 (Note: One appearance in Intercontinental Cup, two appearances in FIFA Club World Championship)	0	38	0
Manchester United	2000–01	Premier League	30	1	2	0	0	0	14	0	1 (Note: Appearance in FA Charity Shield)	0	47	1
Manchester United	2001–02	Premier League	35	0	2	0	0	0	13	1	1	0	51	1
Manchester United	2002–03	Premier League	34	1	2	0	5	0	13	0	–		54	1
Manchester United	2003–04	Premier League	34	0	5	1	0	0	6	1	1 (Note: Appearance in FA Community Shield)	1	46	3
Manchester United	2004–05	Premier League	35	2	4	0	2	0	8	0	1	0	50	2
Manchester United	2005–06	Premier League	33	1	4	0	5	0	6	0	–		48	1
Manchester United	2006–07	Premier League	14	1	2	0	2	0	3	0	–		21	1
Manchester United	2007–08	Premier League	3	0	0	0	0	0	2	0	1	0	6	0
Manchester United	Total		249	6	21	1	14	0	69	2	8	1	361	10
Arsenal	2008–09	Premier League	14	2	2	0	1	0	6	0	–		23	2
Arsenal	2009–10	Premier League	12	1	2	0	3	0	3	0	–		20	1
Arsenal	Total		26	3	4	0	4	0	9	0	–		43	3
Werder Bremen	2010–11	Bundesliga	26	1	1	0	–		3	0	–		30	1
Werder Bremen	2011–12	Bundesliga	1	0	0	0	–		–		–		1	0
Werder Bremen	Total		27	1	1	0	–		3	0	–		31	1
Portland Timbers	2013	Major League Soccer	8	0	–		–		–		–		8	0
Chennaiyin	2014	Indian Super League	14	1	–		–		–		–		14	1
Career total			391	12	36	1	20	0	87	2	8	1	542	15

=== International ===
Appearances and goals by national team and year
National team	Year	Apps	Goals
France	2001	9	1
France	2002	7	1
France	2003	10	0
France	2004	10	0
France	2005	0	0
France	2006	4	0
Total		40	2

Scores and results list France's goal tally first, score column indicates score after each Silvestre goal

List of international goals scored by Mikaël Silvestre
No.	Date	Venue	Opponent	Score	Result	Competition
1	25 April 2001	Stade de France, Saint-Denis, France	Portugal	2–0	4–0	Friendly
2	21 August 2002	Stade du 7 Novembre, Gafsa, Tunisia	Tunisia	1–0	1–1	Friendly

== Honours ==
Manchester United

- Premier League: 1999–2000, 2000–01, 2002–03, 2006–07, 2007-08
- FA Cup: 2003–04
- Football League Cup: 2005–06; runner-up: 2002–03
- FA Community Shield: 2003, 2007
- UEFA Champions League: 2007–08
- Intercontinental Cup: 1999

France

- FIFA Confederations Cup: 2001, 2003
- FIFA World Cup runner-up: 2006
