= Stiven Mendoza =

Colombian footballer (born 1992)

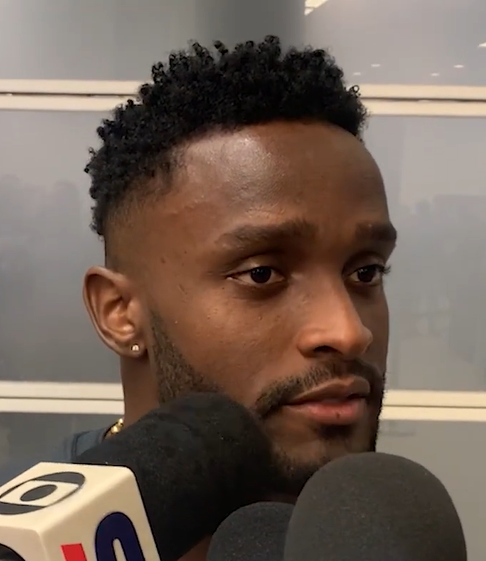
- Mendoza in 2023

Personal information
- Full name: John Stiven Mendoza Valencia
- Date of birth: 27 June 1992 (age 34)
- Place of birth: Palmira, Colombia
- Height: 1.71 m (5 ft 7 in)
- Position: Winger

Team information
- Current team: Athletico Paranaense
- Number: 7

Senior career*
Years	Team	Apps	(Gls)
2010–2013	Envigado	13	(0)
2012	→ América Cali (loan)	52	(10)
2013	→ Cúcuta Deportivo (loan)	15	(4)
2013–2014	Deportivo Cali	21	(2)
2014	Chennaiyin	9	(4)
2015–2017	Corinthians	25	(3)
2015	→ Chennaiyin (loan)	16	(13)
2016	→ New York City (loan)	25	(5)
2017	→ Bahia (loan)	31	(8)
2018–2021	Amiens	72	(14)
2021–2022	Ceará	96	(23)
2023	Santos	45	(10)
2023–2024	Adana Demirspor	14	(3)
2024–2025	León	27	(9)
2025–	Athletico Paranaense	58	(8)

International career^{‡}
2009	Colombia U17	7	(0)
2011	Colombia U20	5	(0)
2019	Colombia	2	(0)
- * Club domestic league appearances and goals as of 15:36, 10 November 2026 (UTC) ‡ National team caps and goals as of 20 November 2019

John Stiven Mendoza Valencia (born 27 June 1992) is a Colombian professional footballer who plays as a winger for Brazilian club Athletico Paranaense. He earned two caps for the Colombia national team in 2019.

Formed at Envigado and loaned to América Cali and Cúcuta Deportivo, he joined Deportivo Cali in 2013. In 2014, he was signed by Chennaiyin for the inaugural Indian Super League season, after which he joined Corinthians, being loaned back for the second installment of the ISL. He won the Golden Boot that season, helping Chennaiyin win the ISL. Following further loans at New York City FC and Bahia he signed for Amiens in January 2018. Three years later, he returned to the Campeonato Brasileiro Série A with Ceará, and subsequently represented Santos, suffering relegation with both clubs. After brief stints at Adana Demirspor in Turkey and Club León in Mexico, Mendoza joined Athletico Paranaense in 2025.

== Club career ==
=== Colombia ===
Born in Palmira, Valle del Cauca, Mendoza began his career at Envigado, making his debut in the Categoría Primera A on 8 August 2010, playing the full 90 minutes in a 1–0 home defeat to Atlético Huila. He made six appearances that season, and three in the following campaign, in addition to a further three in the 2011 Copa Colombia. After loans at América Cali and Cúcuta Deportivo, Mendoza signed a two-year contract at Deportivo Cali, the club who he supports, on 18 July 2013.

=== Chennaiyin FC ===
On 1 October 2014, Mendoza signed for Chennaiyin of the newly founded Indian Super League. He made his debut for the team, captaincy by Marco Materazzi, two weeks later in a 2–1 away win over FC Goa, replacing marquee player Elano for the final 23 minutes. On 28 October, he scored his first goals in the league, a first-half brace in a 5–1 rout of Mumbai City at the Jawaharlal Nehru Stadium. He added a third on 11 November, equalising for a 1–1 draw at FC Pune City, and a fourth eight days later in a 3–1 win over the same opponents. He finished the season with four goals from nine games as Chennaiyin won the regular season, but was absent through injury as they were eliminated in the semi-finals of the 2014 Indian Super League playoffs by Kerala Blasters.

=== Corinthians ===
On 19 December 2014, Mendoza returned to South America, joining Brazil's Sport Club Corinthians Paulista on a four-year deal. He made his debut on 8 February 2015 in the Paulista Derby against Palmeiras, starting in a 1–0 away win in that season's Campeonato Paulista. Seventeen days later, he scored his first goal for the Timão, opening a 2–0 win at Clube Atlético Linense, his only goal in seven regular season appearances. On 19 April, in the knock-out stages, he scored in the 2–2 home semi-final draw against Palmeiras, which his team lost in a penalty shootout.

Mendoza made his Campeonato Brasileiro Série A debut in the first game of the 2015 season, replacing Malcom at the end of a 1–0 win at Cruzeiro on 10 May. He scored once in ten appearances over the campaign, a consolation in a 3–1 loss at Grêmio on 4 June. Corinthians finished the season as national champions.

==== Loan to Chennaiyin ====
On 31 August 2015, Mendoza was loaned back to Chennaiyin for the 2015 season. In their opening game, away to FC Goa, he scored a hat-trick in a 4–0 victory, and five days later he scored both goals in a win over Mumbai City. His sixth goal of the campaign came on 24 October, assisted by Elano in a 2–1 home triumph over Pune City. On 21 November, he recorded his second hat-trick of the campaign, in a 4–1 win over Kerala Blasters, and three days later he opened the scoring in a 4–0 home win over Delhi Dynamos with his tenth goal of the season. Mendoza scored his eleventh of the season on 1 December, beginning a 3–0 win over Mumbai which ended their chances of the play-offs.

On 12 December, in the first leg of the semi-finals, Mendoza concluded a 3–0 home win over reigning champions Atlético de Kolkata (4–2 aggregate). In the final at Goa eight days later, he won two penalty kicks; Bruno Pelissari took the first, which was blocked by Laxmikant Kattimani but he scored the rebound, however Mendoza took the second and had it saved. Losing 2–1 with three minutes remaining, Mendoza scored an added-time winner as his team won 3–2. Mendoza was named the Hero of the League and also won the Golden Boot with 13 goals, two more than second-placed Iain Hume.

==== Loans to New York City and Bahia ====
On 8 March 2016, Mendoza moved to the third continent of his career, signing a season-long loan at New York City FC of Major League Soccer. He made his debut five days later, playing the final 23 minutes in place of Tony Taylor in a 2–2 draw against Toronto FC at the Yankee Stadium. On 30 April, his eighth game, he scored his first goal for the team to decide a 3–2 home victory within five minutes of replacing Khiry Shelton.

On 7 June 2017, Esporte Clube Bahia confirmed the loan of Mendoza for the duration of the 2017 Campeonato Brasileiro Série A. He scored 8 goals in 31 games as the Salvador-based club came 12th, including two in a 3–0 home win over Vasco da Gama on 20 August.

=== Amiens ===
On 17 January 2018, Mendoza moved to the fourth continent of his career, signing for Ligue 1 club Amiens until 2021. He made his debut that same day, starting in a 1–1 home draw with Montpellier HSC. He scored twice in 13 games over the remainder of the season, starting with a consolation in a 3–2 loss at Bordeaux ×on 10 February.

In the summer of 2019, Mendoza sought a transfer out of France after scoring just 4 times in 41 games for Amiens. His negotiations were abandoned due to two personal crises in his country; he was robbed at gunpoint in Medellín on 19 August and his brother was shot dead in Cali on 5 September. Twenty days later, he scored in 106 seconds against Bordeaux, and followed it on 28 September by opening a 1–1 draw at Angers; on 4 October he concluded his club's first-ever win over Marseille by making it 3–1.

The 2019–20 season was Mendoza's best in France with five goals from 15 games, but his team were relegated. On 5 December 2020, he scored twice in a 2–1 Ligue 2 win at Rodez.

=== Ceará ===
In late February 2021, Mendoza returned to the Brazilian top flight, signing with Ceará until the end of 2023; the team paid €600,000 for 60% of his economic rights. He made his debut on 20 March in a goalless home draw with rivals Fortaleza, playing 81 minutes; he scored twice in nine games for the runners-up, in group wins over CSA and Sport Recife at the start of April. On 8 May, his team lost the final on penalties to Bahia, and he was one of five players sent off in a brawl at the end, being suspended for a month. His first national season with the club saw him score once in 28 games – opening a 1–1 draw on his return to Bahia on 27 October.

Mendoza was the top scorer of Vozão during the 2022 season, scoring 22 goals overall, but his team suffered relegation from the top tier.

=== Santos ===
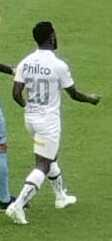
Mendoza playing for Santos in 2023

On 8 December 2022, Mendoza was announced as the new signing of Santos for the upcoming season, and signed a three-year contract with the club. He made his debut for the club the following 14 January, starting in a 2–1 Campeonato Paulista home win over Mirassol.

Mendoza scored his first goal for Peixe on 28 January 2023, netting the equalizer in a 1–1 home draw against Ferroviária.

=== Adana Demirspor ===
On 5 February 2024, Santos announced the contract rescision of Mendoza, and a transfer to Turkish club Adana Demirspor; Santos also retained 20% of the player's economic rights.

== International career ==
Mendoza represented Colombia at the 2009 FIFA U-17 World Cup in Nigeria and the 2011 South American U-20 Championship in Peru.

In late October 2019, following good form for Amiens, manager Carlos Queiroz called up Mendoza for the senior team, for friendlies against neighbours Peru and Ecuador in the United States. His debut was as a 61st-minute substitute for Luis Díaz at the Hard Rock Stadium, in a 1–0 win over the former.

== Career statistics ==
As of 10 November 2026

Appearances and goals by club, season and competition
Club	Season	League			State league (Note: Includes Campeonato Paulista, Campeonato Cearense)		National cup (Note: Includes Copa Colombia, Copa do Brasil, Coupe de France)		League cup (Note: Includes Coupe de la Ligue, Leagues Cup)		Continental		Other		Total	
Club	Season	Division	Apps	Goals	Apps	Goals	Apps	Goals	Apps	Goals	Apps	Goals	Apps	Goals	Apps	Goals
Envigado	2010	Primera A	6	0	—		0	0	—		—		—		6	0
Envigado	2011	Primera A	3	0	—		4	0	—		—		—		7	0
Envigado	Total		9	0	—		4	0	—		—		—		13	0
América Cali (loan)	2012	Primera B	41	10	—		9	0	—		—		2 (Note: Appearances in Primera B promotion play-offs)	0	52	10
Cúcuta Deportivo (loan)	2013	Primera A	15	4	—		5	0	—		—		—		20	4
Deportivo Cali	2013	Primera A	11	1	—		3	0	—		—		—		14	1
Deportivo Cali	2014	Primera A	5	1	—		0	0	—		0	0	2 (Note: Appearances in Superliga Colombiana)	0	7	1
Deportivo Cali	Total		16	2	—		3	0	—		0	0	2	0	21	2
Chennaiyin FC	2014	ISL	9	4	—		—		—		—		—		9	4
Corinthians	2015	Série A	10	1	8	2	1	0	—		6 (Note: Appearances in Copa Libertadores)	0	—		25	3
Chennaiyin FC (loan)	2015	ISL	16	13	—		—		—		—		—		16	13
New York City (loan)	2016	MLS	24	5	—		0	0	—		—		1 (Note: Appearance in MLS Cup Playoffs)	0	25	5
Bahia (loan)	2017	Série A	31	8	—		—		—		—		—		31	8
Amiens	2017–18	Ligue 1	13	2	—		0	0	—		—		—		13	2
Amiens	2018–19	Ligue 1	25	2	—		2	0	1	0	—		—		28	2
Amiens	2019–20	Ligue 1	15	5	—		0	0	2	1	—		—		17	6
Amiens	2020–21	Ligue 2	14	4	—		1	0	—		—		—		15	4
Amiens	Total		67	13	—		3	0	3	1	—		—		73	14
Ceará	2021	Série A	28	1	1	0	—		–		5 (Note: Appearances in Copa Sudamericana)	1	9 (Note: Appearances in Copa do Nordeste)	2	43	4
Ceará	2022	Série A	29	10	2	1	5	1	–		8	6	9	2	53	20
Ceará	Total		57	11	3	1	5	1	–		13	7	18	4	96	24
Santos	2023	Série A	26	6	11	4	4	0	—		4	0	—		45	10
Adana Demirspor	2023–24	Süper Lig	14	3	—		—		—		—		—		14	3
León	2024–25	Liga MX	27	9	—		—		1	0	—		—		28	9
Athletico Paranaense	2025	Série B	21	2	—		3	0	—		—		—		24	2
Athletico Paranaense	2026	Série A	34	6	3	0	3	0	—		—		—		40	6
Athletico Paranaense	Total		55	8	3	0	6	0	—		—		—		66	8
Career total			417	97	25	7	40	1	4	1	23	7	23	4	532	117

== Honours ==
Corinthians

- Campeonato Brasileiro Série A: 2015

Chennaiyin

- Indian Super League: 2015

Individual

- Indian Super League Hero of the League: 2015
- Indian Super League Golden Boot: 2015
