= Sara Del Carmen Jofre González =

Sara Del Carmen Jofre González (September 28, 1935 – February 18, 2008) was the President and CEO of the Georgia Hispanic Chamber of Commerce (1996–2008) and founder of the Hispanic American Center for Economic Development (2001) in Atlanta.

She received the Civic Venture's Purpose Prize, in 2007, for her work and leadership in social innovation; MALDEF's (Mexican American Legal Defense and Education Fund)"Lifetime Achievement Award" in 2008; and the Georgia State Senate's Resolution SR 1102, also in 2008, for her work and leadership in social innovation. (1), (2), (5)

== Biography ==
Sara Del Carmen Jofre González, the daughter of Ricardo Jofre and Cecilia Rodriguez Jofre, was born September 28, 1935, in Havana, Cuba, but fled the country late in 1960 with her two young children, Luis de La Valette and Ofelia de La Valette. Her first husband, a recognized equestrian who had represented Cuba in the Pan-American Games and whose family owned the Perez-Vento Sanatorium in Guanabacoa, had been publicly denounced by the new government controlled media as a counter-revolutionary and as such faced imprisonment and execution by firing squad. They relocated to New York City. She later married Harvard fellow Dr. Fernando González and had a daughter, Isabel González. They relocated to Atlanta, Georgia in 1975. Sara and Fernando opened one of the first Cuban restaurants in Atlanta, Sarita's, which was reviewed by USA Today in 1986 and featured as one of the best Cuban restaurants in the country. The restaurant ultimately closed, but she frequently credited the experience as giving her the passion for wanting to help others succeed where she had failed. She later worked for the Latin American Association in Atlanta as fundraiser, and the International Olympic Committee as the director of Hispanic Community Relations. (4), (12)

She has said of Fidel Castro's impact on her life: "Fidel Castro has done a lot of bad things, but in a way he changed me, who I am and who I was supposed to be." (8)

Sara has been interviewed for and featured in numerous media outlets including: The Economist, Atlanta Journal-Constitution, AARP Magazine, Delta Sky, The Chronicle of Philanthropy, The New York Times, The Wall Street Journal with a special podcast on the Wall Street Journal web site, the BBC, PBS, local radio and television stations throughout Georgia. (10), (13), (16)

Sara sat on numerous boards including: Junior Achievement of Georgia, the Atlanta Stakeholder's Committee, the Atlanta Police Foundation, and Vote America. (3), (7)

Her son, Luis de La Valette, lives in Miami and is retired from the lumber industry. Her daughter, Ofelia de La Valette, owns a dance studio, Dance 101, in Atlanta, Georgia, and her youngest daughter, Isabel Cristina Gonzalez Whitaker lives in New York City and is an editor for InStyle magazine and author of Latin Chic: Entertaining with Style and Sass. (11), (14)

== Career ==
An advocate and leader for Hispanic economic growth and immigrant rights, she established many services and programs to aid the newly arrived as well as those seeking betterment through entrepreneurship. (1), (2)

As President and CEO of the GHCC, she increased membership over 660% (1500 members in 2007) by targeting for the first time corporate entities headquartered in Georgia such as The Home Depot (who placed an executive level Vice President on the GHCC's Board of Directors 2008), The Coca-Cola Company, Georgia Power and Light, The UPS Company, and AT&T as well as numerous local Hispanic firms. Of broadening membership to include corporate companies, she would proudly state that she "finally got them to eat black beans" and therefore they understood the relevance and importance of the growing Hispanic community. Her leadership firmly established the GHCC as the largest Hispanic Chamber in the Southeast. She established the GHCC annual gala making it the largest event reaching the Hispanic market in the state of Georgia. In 2000, she created the Hispanic Caucus at Georgia State Capital, Hispanic Day at the Capitol, and Political Candidates Forums helping to bring Hispanic politicians and Hispanic issues to wider audience in Georgia. In 2000 she also created the Hispanic Business and Career Expo with more than 700 participants annually in Atlanta. (3), (4), (8), (9), (18), (19)

In 2001 she established "HACED", the Hispanic American Center for Economic Development, the first ever business incubator for Hispanics in all of the southeast United States; To date more than 11,000 new businesses started in Georgia; has helped more than 35,000 entrepreneurs in all aspects of business with more than 100 educational seminars offered. Satellite offices and programs in Savannah, Dalton, Athens, Augusta, Cartersville, Canton, Gainesville, Lyons, Moultrie, Nashville, Newnan, Rome, Quitman, Tifton, Valdosta, and Warner Robins, Georgia. (5), (6), (12)

"I come here everyday to try to help the Latino community." Gonzalez says in her 2007 Purpose Prize interview about the GHCC and HACED. "I see our organization as a bridge between the Latino community and corporate America. Through our small business incubator we try to address the individual needs to whoever comes to us." (1)

From 2004 to 2007, Sara established, under the umbrella of the GHCC, the Argentine-American Chamber of Commerce, Dominican-American Chamber of Commerce, and the Ecuadorian-American Chamber of Commerce to open doors to new markets for Georgia business and their foreign counterparts. (7), (12)

"Sara and I were colleagues at the Atlanta Committee for the Olympic Games," said Atlanta Mayor Shirley Franklin. "She was a friend whose vision for Georgia included everybody. She dedicated her life to her family and worked tirelessly to form alliances and partnerships for the betterment of the Hispanic community all the while advancing business opportunities for all minorities. As a friend she was warm, open and supportive in every step of my professional life. I offer my condolences to her family and extended family of friends." (20)

== Honors ==
- 2000: Named by Atlanta Magazine one of "Georgia's Most Powerful and Influential Women"
- 2001-2007: Named each year by Atlanta Business Chronicle one of "100 Most Influential Atlantans"
- 2002: 7 Stages Theater, Atlanta, Georgia, "Leading Ladies Award"
- 2002: Featured in the book "Atlanta Women Speak"
- 2002: Women Looking Ahead Magazine "Ordinary Women With Extraordinary Talents"
- 2002: Appointed by Georgia Governor Roy Barnes to Latino Commission
- 2003: Appointed by Georgia Governor Sonny Perdue to Latino Commission and to the Board of Directors of Hemisphere, Inc.
- 2003: Atlanta Technical College Foundation "Bridge Builder" Award
- 2003: Atlanta History Center "Enterprising Women" exhibition
- 2003: YWCA named as "Greater Atlanta's Women Achievers"
- 2004: United States Hispanic Chamber of Commerce "Political Empowerment" Award
- 2005: Profiled in Houghton Milton's Business Communications college textbook, Contemporary Business Communication, Sixth Edition
- 2006: Atlanta Tribune's ""Wonder Women: Celebrating Women's History Month"
- 2007: Latino's in Information Sciences and Technology Assoc. "Community Advocate" Award
- 2007: Keynote Speaker, 2007 Turknett Leadership Group Women In Leadership Breakfast Seminar Series
- 2007: Encore.org "Purpose Prize", Stanford University
- 2007: Profiled in Atlanta Magazine as Atlanta Global Leader
- 2008: Tribute, Halftime, first-ever Atlanta WNBA game played by the Atlanta Dream
- 2008: MALDEF (Mexican American Legal Defense and Education Fund) "Lifetime Achievement" award
- 2008: Dia de la Mujer Breast Cancer survivor tribute
- 2008: Georgia State Senate Resolution 1102 in honor of and in recognition of her life (12), (15), (17)
