= Jairo Suárez =

Colombian footballer (born 1985)

Personal information
- Full name: Jairo Andrés Suárez Carvajal
- Date of birth: March 24, 1985 (age 41)
- Place of birth: Bogotá, Colombia
- Height: 1.77 m (5 ft 10 in)
- Position: Defender

Youth career
- 1995–2001: Santa Fe

Senior career*
Years	Team	Apps	(Gls)
2001–2011	Santa Fe		
2010	→ América de Cali (loan)	23	(0)
2011	La Equidad	8	(1)
2012	Cúcuta Deportivo	14	(0)
2012	Fortaleza	11	(1)
2013	Santa Fe	8	(1)
2014	Chennaiyin	7	(0)
- * Club domestic league appearances and goals

Jairo Andrés Suárez Carvajal (born March 24, 1985) is a Colombian retired footballer.

== Career ==
Born in Bogotá, Suárez began playing football with Santa Fe. He made his professional debut for Santa Fe with a substitute's appearance against Millonarios in July 2002.

Usually a central defender, he has played almost his whole career at Santa Fe. In 2014, he joined the Indian Super League team Chennaiyin FC. He played for Colombia in the 2005 Sub 20 World Cup qualifiers.
