= 2015 Indian Super League playoffs =

2015 Indian Super League Cup playoffs
Tournament details
- Country: India
- Dates: 11–20 December 2015
- Teams: 4

Final positions
- Champions: Chennaiyin FC (1st title)
- Runners-up: FC Goa

Tournament statistics
- Matches played: 5
- Goals scored: 15 (3 per match)

The 2015 Indian Super League playoffs was the second playoffs series at the end of the Indian Super League season. The playoffs began on 11 December and culminated on 20 December with the final.

The final match was played between FC Goa & Chennaiyin FC at the Fatorda Stadium in Margao, Goa, where Chennaiyin beat Goa 3–2 to become the champions of the 2015 season.

== Qualification ==
Pos	Team	Pld	W	D	L	GF	GA	GD	Pts	Qualification or relegation
1	Goa	14	7	4	3	29	20	+9	25	Advance to ISL Play-offs
2	Atlético de Kolkata	14	7	2	5	26	17	+9	23	Advance to ISL Play-offs
3	Chennaiyin (C)	14	7	1	6	25	15	+10	22	Advance to ISL Play-offs
4	Delhi Dynamos	14	6	4	4	18	20	−2	22	Advance to ISL Play-offs
5	NorthEast United	14	6	2	6	18	23	−5	20	
6	Mumbai City	14	4	4	6	16	26	−10	16	
7	Pune City	14	4	3	7	17	23	−6	15	
8	Kerala Blasters	14	3	4	7	22	27	−5	13	

Source: Indian Super League standings
Rules for classification: 1) points; 2) goal difference; 3) number of goals scored.
(C) Champions

== Bracket ==
Semi-Finals
1	Goa	0	3	3
4	Delhi Dynamos	1	0	1
2	Atlético de Kolkata	0	2	2
3	Chennaiyin	3	1	4

Final
1	Goa	2
3	Chennaiyin	3

== Semi-finals ==
The first legs were played on 11 and 12 December, and the second legs were played on 15 and 16 December 2015. Due to massive floods in Chennai, the first leg of the semi-final between Atlético de Kolkata and Chennayin were played at Pune instead of Chennai.

Team 1	Agg.	Team 2	1st leg	2nd leg
Goa (India)	3–1	(India) Delhi Dynamos	0–1	3–0
Atlético de Kolkata (India)	2–4	(India) Chennaiyin	0–3	2–1

=== Leg 1 ===
11 December
19:00 IST

Delhi Dynamos	1–0	Goa
Singh 42'	Report

Jawaharlal Nehru Stadium, Delhi
Attendance: 23,874

12 December
19:00 IST

Chennaiyin	3–0	Atlético de Kolkata
Pelissari 38'; Lalpekhlua 57'; Mendoza 68'	Report

Shree Shiv Chhatrapati Sports Complex, Pune
Attendance: 7,965

=== Leg 2 ===
15 December
19:00 IST

Goa	3–0	Delhi Dynamos
Jofre 11'; Rafael Coelho 27'; Dudu 84'	Report

Fatorda Stadium, Goa
Attendance: 19,796

16 December
19:00 IST

Atlético de Kolkata	2–1	Chennaiyin
Lekić 22'; Hume 87'	Report	Fikru 90'

Salt Lake Stadium, Kolkata
Attendance: 68,340

== Final ==
20 December
19:00 IST

Goa	2–3	Chennaiyin
Haokip 58'; Jofre 87'	Report	Pelissari 54'; Kattimani 90' (o.g.); Mendoza 90+1'

Fatorda Stadium, Goa
Attendance: 18,477
Referee: Yudai Yamamoto

== See also ==
- 2015–16 in Indian football
- 2015–16 I-League
