= Jofre =

Jofre or Jofré may refer to the following people

Given name

- Jofre Carreras (born 2001), Spanish footballer
- Jofre de Foixà (died c. 1300), Catalan poet, musician and abbot
- Jofré Llançol i Escrivà (c.1390–c.1436), Spanish noble
- Jofre, Jofre Mateu González (born 1980), Spanish former footballer

Surname

- Éder Jofre (born 1936), Brazilian boxer
- Joan Gilabert Jofré (1350–1417), Spanish priest
- Juan Pablo Jofre (born 1983), Argentinian musician, composer and arranger
- Oscar Jofre (born 1965), Canadian entrepreneur and technology specialist
- Sara Del Carmen Jofre González (1935–2008), Cuban-American businesswoman

== See also ==
- Porto Jofre, a settlement in southern Brazil
- Gioffre
