= Francesco Franzese =

Italian footballer and coach

Personal information
- Date of birth: 8 September 1981 (age 45)
- Place of birth: Nola, Italy
- Height: 1.86 m (6 ft 1 in)
- Position: Goalkeeper

Youth career
- Novara

Senior career*
Years	Team	Apps	(Gls)
2000–2001	Ancona	0	(0)
2001–2006	Novara	53	(0)
2006–2007	Juve Stabia	1	(0)
2007–2009	Verona	1	(0)
2009–2010	Nocerina	12	(0)
2010–2014	Corridonia		
2014	Chennaiyin	0	(0)

Managerial career
- 2014–2016: Chennaiyin (Goalkeepers coach)
- 2018–: Arezzo (Goalkeepers coach)
- * Club domestic league appearances and goals

Francesco Franzese (born 8 September 1981) is an Italian former footballer who played as a goalkeeper. He is currently the goalkeeping coach for Serie C side Arezzo.
