= Hans Mulder =

Dutch footballer (born 1987)

Personal information
- Full name: Hans Jorge Mulder
- Date of birth: 27 April 1987 (age 39)
- Place of birth: Amsterdam, Netherlands
- Height: 1.80 m (5 ft 11 in)
- Position: Midfielder

Team information
- Current team: VV Unicum

Youth career
- Zeeburgia
- Zaragoza
- 2004–2006: RKC Waalwijk

Senior career*
Years	Team	Apps	(Gls)
2006–2011	RKC	125	(6)
2011–2013	Willem II	52	(4)
2013–2014	NEC	9	(0)
2014	Delhi Dynamos	13	(3)
2015	Nordsjælland	8	(0)
2015	Delhi Dynamos	15	(0)
2016	Cacereño	5	(0)
2016	Chennaiyin	12	(2)
2017	Eldense	8	(0)
2017–2023	RKC	96	(5)
2023–	VV Unicum		
- * Club domestic league appearances and goals as of 28 May 2023

Hans Jorge Mulder (born 27 April 1987) is a Dutch professional footballer who plays for amateur club VV Unicum.

Born to a Spanish mother and a Dutch father, Mulder has had a journeyman career and played for clubs in his native Netherlands, Spain, Denmark and India. He is most noted for his two stints at RKC Waalwijk, for whom he has made more than 200 appearances.

== Career ==
=== Early years ===
Born in Amsterdam to a Spanish mother and a Dutch father, Mulder played in the youth departments of Zeeburgia and Spanish club Zaragoza, before joining the academy of RKC Waalwijk in 2004. In the winter break of the 2006–07 season, Mulder was promoted to the RKC first team. In total he made 125 appearances for the club. At the start of the 2011–12 season, he was signed by Willem II on a free transfer. He left this club again on a free transfer at the end of the 2012–13 season. In November 2013, Mulder signed a two-year contract with NEC. With the Nijmegen club, he suffered relegation from the Eredivisie in the 2013–14 season. Due to a relegation clause in his contract, his deal was terminated in June 2014.

=== Journeyman years ===
On 8 September 2014, he signed for Indian club Delhi Dynamos FC, where he joined a team which included Italian star Alessandro Del Piero. He made his debut for the club on 14 October 2014 in a match against FC Pune City where he played the full 90 minutes. Mulder signed a six-month contract with Danish Superliga club FC Nordsjælland in January 2015. They had signed him on a free transfer after his contract with Delhi Dynamos expired. He returned to Delhi Dynamos for his second season in the Indian Super League afterwards, making it to the semi-finals under player-coach Roberto Carlos. On 9 March 2016, he signed for the remainder of the 2015–16 season with Spanish Segunda División B club Cacereño. For the 2016 season of the Indian Super League, Mulder returned to play for Chennaiyin FC. In the beginning of 2017, Mulder moved to CD Eldense in the Segunda División B. On 3 April, the club withdrew the already virtually relegated team from the competition after an embarrassing 12–0 defeat to FC Barcelona B. The club turned around on the decision the following day, but at that point complaints of match fixing at Eldense had already been made, and as a result Mulder left the club.

=== Return to RKC Waalwijk ===
In August 2017, Mulder reported to Mark Luijpers, the assistant coach of VVV-Venlo with whom he previously worked at Delhi Dynamos, for a trial period with the Eredivisie side. On 3 October, Mulder signed a one-year contract with RKC Waalwijk. In 2019, he reached promotion to the Eredivisie with RKC after promotion play-offs. Mulder subsequently signed a one-year contract extension with the club.

=== VV Unicum ===
On 4 April 2023, Mulder agreed to join VV Unicum for the 2023–24 season.

== Career statistics ==
As of match played 20 September 2020

Appearances and goals by club, season and competition
Club	Season	League			Cup		Other		Total	
Club	Season	Division	Apps	Goals	Apps	Goals	Apps	Goals	Apps	Goals
RKC Waalwijk	2006–07	Eredivisie	7	0	1	0	0	0	8	0
RKC Waalwijk	2007–08	Eerste Divisie	31	1	3	0	2 (Note: All appearance(s) in Eerste Divisie playoffs)	0	36	1
RKC Waalwijk	2008–09	Eerste Divisie	32	2	1	0	4	0	37	2
RKC Waalwijk	2009–10	Eredivisie	27	1	0	0	—		27	1
RKC Waalwijk	2010–11	Eerste Divisie	28	2	5	0	—		33	2
RKC Waalwijk	Total		125	6	10	0	6	0	141	6
Willem II	2011–12	Eerste Divisie	30	2	1	0	1	0	32	2
Willem II	2012–13	Eredivisie	22	2	1	0	—		23	2
Willem II	Total		52	4	2	0	1	0	55	4
NEC	2013–14	Eerste Divisie	9	0	0	0	0	0	9	0
Delhi Dynamos	2014	Indian Super League	13	3	—		—		13	3
Nordsjælland	2014–15	Danish Superliga	8	0	0	0	—		8	0
Delhi Dynamos	2015	Indian Super League	13	0	—		2 (Note: All appearance(s) in Indian Super League playoffs)	0	15	0
Cacereño	2015–16	Segunda División B	5	0	—		0	0	5	0
Chennaiyin FC	2016	Indian Super League	12	2	—		—		12	2
Eldense	2016–17	Segunda División B	8	0	—		—		8	0
RKC Waalwijk	2017–18	Eerste Divisie	27	2	2	0	—		29	2
RKC Waalwijk	2018–19	Eerste Divisie	30	2	3	0	6	1	39	3
RKC Waalwijk	2019–20	Eredivisie	18	1	0	0	—		18	1
RKC Waalwijk	2020–21	Eredivisie	1	0	0	0	—		1	0
RKC Waalwijk	Total		76	5	5	0	6	1	87	6
Career total			321	20	17	0	15	1	353	21

== Honours ==
RKC Waalwijk:

- Eerste Divisie: 2010–11
