= Bruno Pelissari =

Brazilian footballer (born 1993)

Personal information
- Full name: Bruno Augusto Pelissari de Lima
- Date of birth: 3 January 1993 (age 33)
- Place of birth: Umuarama, Brazil
- Height: 1.81 m (5 ft 11 1/2 in)
- Position: Attacking midfielder

Youth career
- Atlético Paranaense

Senior career*
Years	Team	Apps	(Gls)
2013–2016	Atlético Paranaense	0	(0)
2014	→ Chennaiyin (loan)	11	(4)
2015	→ Chennaiyin (loan)	14	(3)
2016	Sheriff Tiraspol	3	(0)
2016	Delhi Dynamos	10	(0)
2017–2019	Votuporanguense	0	(0)
2019	Gokulam Kerala	2	(0)
- * Club domestic league appearances and goals

Bruno Augusto Pelissari de Lima (born 3 January 1993), popularly known as Bruno Pelissari, is a Brazilian professional footballer. He has previously played for Atlético Paranaense, in the Indian Super League with Chennaiyin and Delhi Dynamos, and for Sheriff Tiraspol in Moldova.

== Career ==
=== Club career ===
==== Chennaiyin ====
Pelissari was loaned to Indian Super League club Chennaiyin FC for the 2014 season, where he scored 4 goals in 11 appearances. Pelissari rejoined Chennaiyin FC on loan for the 2015 Indian Super League. He played a very crucial part for Chennaiyin FC in the 2015 Indian Super League season. He scored in the final and helped Chennaiyin FC to win the 2015 Indian Super League season.

==== Sheriff Tiraspol ====
On 1 March 2016, Pelissari signed for Moldovan Divizia Națională side Sheriff Tiraspol. he only managed to play three games for Divizia Națională side Sheriff Tiraspol. He was released from the contract after the end of the season.

==== Delhi Dynamos ====
On 1 August 2016, Bruno Pellisari was unveiled as a new player of Delhi Dynamos. He was the second signing of the season.

==== Votuporanguense ====
In October 2017, he joined Brazilian club Votuporanguense.

Gokulam Kerala

In July 2019, he returned for his third stint in India, this time with I-League club Gokulam Kerala FC.

== Career statistics ==
As of match played 14 December 2016

Appearances and goals by club, season and competition
Club	Season	League			State League		National Cup		Continental		Other		Total	
Club	Season	Division	Apps	Goals	Apps	Goals	Apps	Goals	Apps	Goals	Apps	Goals	Apps	Goals
Atlético Paranaense	2013	Série A	0	0	9	0	–		–		–		9	0
Atlético Paranaense	2014	Série A	0	0	0	0	–		–		–		0	0
Atlético Paranaense	2015	Série A	0	0	5	1	–		–		–		5	1
Atlético Paranaense	Total		0	0	14	1	-	-	-	-	-	-	14	1
Chennaiyin (loan)	2014	Indian Super League	9	4	–		–		–		2	0	11	4
Chennaiyin (loan)	2015	Indian Super League	11	1	–		–		–		3	2	14	3
Chennaiyin (loan)	Total		20	5	-	-	-	-	-	-	5	2	25	7
Sheriff Tiraspol	2015–16	Divizia Națională	3	0	–		0	0	0	0	–		3	0
Delhi Dynamos	2016	Indian Super League	10	0	–		–		–		1	0	11	0
Career total			23	5	14	1	-	-	-	-	6	2	53	8

== Honors ==
=== Club ===
==== Chennaiyin FC ====
- Indian Super League: 2015 - Champions

Gokulam Kerala F.C.

- Durand Cup : 2019
