= 2014 Atlético de Kolkata season =

1st season in existence of Atlético de Kolkata

Atlético de Kolkata
2014 season
- Head Coach: (Spain) Antonio López Habas
- Stadium: Salt Lake Stadium
- ISL: Champions
- Top goalscorer: (Ethiopia) Fikru Teferra (5 goals)
- Highest home attendance: 65,000 (vs Mumbai City, 12 October 2014)
- Lowest home attendance: 21,550 (vs Pune City, 7 November 2014)
- Average home league attendance: 45,171

The 2014 season was Atlético de Kolkata's inaugural season in existence in the Indian Super League. They ended their first season as the champions of the inaugural edition of the competition.

== Background ==
In early 2014 it was announced that the All India Football Federation, the national federation for football in India, and IMG-Reliance would be accepting bids for ownership of eight of nine selected cities for the upcoming Indian Super League, an eight-team franchise league modeled along the lines of the Indian Premier League cricket tournament. On 13 April 2014, it was announced that Sourav Ganguly, Harshavardhan Neotia, Sanjiv Goenka, Utsav Parekh, and Spanish La Liga side Atlético Madrid had won the bidding for the Kolkata franchise. Shahrukh Khan also submitted bids for the franchise but lost out The Kolkata franchise turned out to be the most expensive franchise, being purchased for 18 crore.

On 7 May 2014, during an official launch, it was announced that the name of the team would be Atlético de Kolkata. Indian Super League (ISL) Opening Ceremony Match will started with Atlético de Kolkata vs Mumbai City FC which will be the first match.

== Signings ==
The first ever signing by the team was made on 3 July 2014, when former Real Madrid midfielder Borja Fernández was signed. He is also the first ever player signing in league history. Then, five days later, on 8 July 2014 it was confirmed that former Liverpool midfielder, Luis García, as their marquee for the 2014 season as well as the signing of Botswana international Ofentse Nato. The club then signed 14 Indian players between 22 July and 23 July during the 2014 ISL Inaugural Domestic Draft. This was followed by 6 foreigners from the Foreign Player Draft.

Atlético de Kolkata then began the month of August by signing Ethiopia international Fikru Teferra. and Spanish Goalkeeper Basilio Sancho Agudo.

In September Atlético signed Bangladesh captain Mamunul Islam.

=== Foreign signings ===
#	Position:	Player	Last club	Date	Source
	MF	(Spain) Borja Fernández	(Spain) Getafe	3 July 2014	
	MF	(Spain) Luis García	(Mexico) Pumas UNAM	8 July 2014	
	MF	(Botswana) Ofentse Nato	(South Africa) Bidvest Wits	8 July 2014	
	FW	(Ethiopia) Fikru Teferra	(South Africa) Milano United	11 August 2014	
	MF	(Bangladesh) Mamunul Islam	(Bangladesh) Dhanmondi Club	5 September 2014	

=== Drafted domestic players ===
Round	Position	Player	I-League club
1	FW	(India) Cavin Lobo	East Bengal
2	DF	(India) Arnab Mondal	East Bengal
3	DF	(India) Denzil Franco	Churchill Brothers
4	DF	(India) Rakesh Masih	Mohammedan
5	MF	(India) Mohammed Rafique	East Bengal
6	FW	(India) Mohammed Rafi	Mumbai
7	DF	(India) Biswajit Saha	Mohun Bagan
8	MF	(India) Sanju Pradhan	East Bengal
9	DF	(India) Kingshuk Debnath	Mohun Bagan
10	MF	(India) Lester Fernandez	Pune
11	GK	(India) Subhasish Roy Chowdhury	Dempo
12	FW	(India) Baljit Sahni	East Bengal
13	MF	(India) Climax Lawrence	Mumbai
14	DF	(India) Nallappan Mohanraj	Sporting Goa

=== Drafted foreign players ===
Round	Position	Player	Last Club
1	MF	(Spain) Borja Fernández (retained)	Getafe
2	MF	(Spain) Jofre Mateu	Girona
3	DF	(Spain) Josemi	Xanthi
4	FW	(Spain) Arnal Llibert	Alcorcon
5	DF	(France) Sylvain Monsoreau	Troyes
6	MF	(Czech Republic) Jakub Podaný	Prague
7	GK	(Armenia) Apoula Edel	Tel Aviv

== Players ==
=== Player squad ===
As of 19 October 2014

Note: Flags indicate national team as defined under FIFA eligibility rules; some limited exceptions apply. Players may hold more than one non-FIFA nationality.

No.	Pos.	Nation	Player
1	GK	IND	Subhasish Roy Chowdhury
2	DF	IND	Biswajit Saha
3	DF	IND	Nallappan Mohanraj
4	DF	IND	Kingshuk Debnath
5	DF	IND	Arnab Mondal
6	FW	IND	Baljit Sahni
7	MF	IND	Cavin Lobo
8	MF	ESP	Borja Fernández
9	FW	ETH	Fikru Teferra
10	MF	ESP	Luis García (captain)
11	MF	ESP	Jofre Mateu
12	DF	IND	Denzil Franco
13	GK	ESP	Basilio Sancho

No.	Pos.	Nation	Player
14	FW	IND	Mohammed Rafi
15	MF	IND	Sanju Pradhan
16	MF	IND	Climax Lawrence
17	DF	ESP	Josemi
18	FW	IND	Mohammed Rafique
19	MF	BAN	Mamunul Islam
20	MF	IND	Rakesh Masih
21	MF	CZE	Jakub Podaný
22	MF	IND	Lester Fernandez
23	MF	BOT	Ofentse Nato
24	FW	ESP	Arnal Llibert
25	GK	ARM	Apoula Edel
26	DF	FRA	Sylvain Monsoreau

== Technical staff ==
As of October 2014.

Position	Name
Head coach	(Spain) Antonio López Habas
Assistant coach	(Brazil) Jose Ramirez Barreto
Fitness coach	(Spain) Miguel Martinez

== Pre-season and friendlies ==
Atlético de Kolkata trained in Spain in Los Angeles de San Rafael under manager Antonio Lopez Habas.

9 September 2014 Exhibition match	Atlético de Kolkata (India)	6 – 0	(Spain) Gimnástica Segoviana - B	Madrid, Spain
19:00 IST		Report		Stadium: Los Ángeles De San Rafael

11 September 2014 Exhibition match	Atlético de Kolkata (India)	6 – 0	(Spain) Gimnástica Segoviana - B	Madrid, Spain
19:00 IST				Stadium: Los Ángeles De San Rafael

16 September 2014 Exhibition match	Atlético de Kolkata (India)	3 – 0	(Spain) Unami	Madrid, Spain
19:00 IST

18 September 2014 Exhibition match	Atlético de Kolkata (India)	2 – 2	(Spain) Gimnástica Segoviana	Madrid, Spain
19:00 IST

23 September 2014 Exhibition match	Atlético de Kolkata (India)	0 – 0	(Spain) Collado Villalba	Madrid, Spain
19:00 IST

30 September 2014 Exhibition match	Atlético de Kolkata (India)	1 – 0	(India) Chima Okorie XI	Kolkata, India
19:00 IST

5 October 2014 Exhibition match	Atlético de Kolkata (India)	1 – 3	(India) Pinki Roy XI	Kolkata, India
19:00 IST

== Competitions ==
=== Indian Super League ===
==== League table ====
Pos	Team	Pld	W	D	L	GF	GA	GD	Pts	Qualification
1	Chennaiyin	14	6	5	3	24	20	+4	23	Advance to ISL Play-offs
2	Goa	14	6	4	4	21	12	+9	22	Advance to ISL Play-offs
3	Atlético de Kolkata (C)	14	4	7	3	16	13	+3	19	Advance to ISL Play-offs
4	Kerala Blasters	14	5	4	5	9	11	−2	19	Advance to ISL Play-offs
5	Delhi Dynamos	14	4	6	4	16	14	+2	18	

Source: Soccerway
Rules for classification: 1) points; 2) head-to-head points; 3) head-to-head goal difference; 4) goal difference; 5) number of goals scored; 6) play-off match
(C) Champions

==== Results summary ====
Overall								Home						Away					
Pld	W	D	L	GF	GA	GD	Pts	W	D	L	GF	GA	GD	W	D	L	GF	GA	GD
9	4	4	1	11	7	+4	16	2	3	1	6	5	+1	2	1	0	5	2	+3

Last updated: 7 November 2014.
Source: Matches

==== Results by round ====
Round	1	2	3	4	5	6	7	8	9	10	11	12	13	14
Ground	H	A	H	A	H	A	H	H	H	A	A	A	A	H
Result	W	W	D	W	D	D	L	D	W	L	D	D	L	D

Updated to match(es) played on 7 November 2014. Source: Matches
A = Away; H = Home; W = Win; D = Draw; L = Loss

==== Matches ====
12 October 2014 1	Atlético de Kolkata	3 – 0	Mumbai City	Kolkata
19:00 IST	Teferra 27'; Fernández 69'; Llibert 90+3'	Report		Stadium: Salt Lake Stadium; Attendance: 65,000; Referee: Chris Penso

16 October 2014 2	NorthEast United	0 – 2	Atlético de Kolkata	Guwahati
19:00 IST		Report	Teferra 15'; Podaný 90+2'	Stadium: Indira Gandhi Athletic Stadium; Attendance: 25,530; Referee: Tejas Nagvenkar

19 October 2014 3	Atlético de Kolkata	1 – 1	Delhi Dynamos	Kolkata
16:30 IST	Mateu 49' (pen.)	Report	Pavel Eliáš 73'	Stadium: Salt Lake Stadium; Attendance: 55,793; Referee: Santosh Kumar

23 October 2014 4	FC Goa	1 – 2	Atlético de Kolkata	Goa
19:00 IST	Santos 21'	Report	Lobo 72', 84'	Stadium: Fatorda Stadium; Attendance: 17,343; Referee: Chris Penso

26 October 2014 5	Atlético de Kolkata	1 – 1	Kerala Blasters	Kolkata
16:30 IST	Sahni 23'	Report	Hume 41'	Stadium: Salt Lake Stadium; Attendance: 30,000

4 November 2014 6	Chennaiyin FC	1 – 1	Atlético de Kolkata	Chennai
16:30 IST	Elano 90 +3' (pen.)		García 35' (pen.)	Stadium: Jawaharlal Nehru Stadium (Chennai); Attendance: 24,088

7 November 2014 7	Atlético de Kolkata	1 – 3	Pune	Kolkata
16:30 IST	Teferra 84' (pen.)		Dudu 35'; Kostas 55'; Davide 89'	Stadium: Salt Lake Stadium; Attendance: 21,550

14 November 2014 8	Atlético de Kolkata	0 - 0	Chennaiyin FC	Kolkata
19:00IST				Stadium: Salt Lake Stadium; Attendance: 46,288; Referee: Pratap Singh

18 November 2014 9	Atlético de Kolkata	1 - 0	Northeast United FC	Kolkata
19:00IST	Luis Garcia 51'			Stadium: Salt Lake Stadium; Attendance: 37,153

21 November 2014 10	Kerala Blasters	2 - 1	Atlético de Kolkata	Kochi
19:00IST	Hume 4'; Gusmao 42'		Teferra 55'	Stadium: Jawaharlal Nehru Stadium; Attendance: 57,296

29 November 2014 11	Pune	1 - 1	Atlético de Kolkata	Pune
19:00IST				Stadium: Shree Shiv Chhatrapati Sports Complex Stadium; Attendance: 8,342

== Player statistics ==
=== Statistics ===
As of 3 November 2014

No.	Pos	Nat	Player	Total		ISL	
No.	Pos	Nat	Player	Apps	Goals	Apps	Goals
1	GK	(India) IND	Subhasish Roy Chowdhury	3	0	3+0	0
5	DF	(India) IND	Arnab Mondal	4	0	4+0	0
2	DF	(India) IND	Biswajit Saha	4	0	4+0	0
12	DF	(India) IND	Denzil Franco	4	0	4+0	0
4	DF	(India) IND	Kingshuk Debnath	0	0	0+0	0
	DF	(India) IND	Nallappan Mohanraj	0	0	0+0	0
10	MF	(Spain) ESP	Luis García	3	2	3+0	2
23	MF	(Botswana) BOT	Ofentse Nato	4	0	4+0	0
	MF	(India) IND	Climax Lawrence	0	0	0+0	0
22	MF	(India) IND	Lester Fernandez	0	0	0+0	0
20	MF	(India) IND	Rakesh Masih	1	0	0+1	0
15	MF	(India) IND	Sanju Pradhan	4	0	0+4	0
8	MF	(Spain) ESP	Borja Fernández	3	1	3+0	1
	MF	(Bangladesh) BAN	Mamunul Islam	0	0	0+0	0
9	FW	(Ethiopia) ETH	Fikru Teferra	4	3	4+0	3
6	FW	(India) IND	Baljit Sahni	4	0	4+0	0
7	FW	(India) IND	Cavin Lobo	1	2	1+0	2
14	FW	(India) IND	Mohammed Rafi	0	0	0+0	0
	FW	(India) IND	Mohammed Rafique	0	0	0+0	0
25	GK	(Armenia) ARM	Apoula Edel	1	0	1+0	0
	GK	(Spain) ESP	Basilio Sancho Agudo	0	0	0+0	0
26	DF	(France) FRA	Sylvain Monsoreau	1	0	0+1	0
17	DF	(Spain) ESP	Josemi	4	0	4+0	0
11	MF	(Spain) ESP	Jofre Mateu	4	1	4+0	1
21	MF	(Czech Republic) CZE	Jakub Podaný	3	1	1+2	1
24	FW	(Spain) ESP	Arnal Llibert	4	1	0+4	1

=== Goals ===
As of 4 November 2014

This includes all competitive matches. The list is sorted by shirt number when total goals are equal.

Rank	Player	Pos	ISL	Other	Total
1	(India) Cavin Lobo	FW	2	0	2
1	(Ethiopia) Fikru Teferra	FW	3	0	2
2	(Spain) Borja Fernández	MF	1	0	1
2	(Spain) Arnal Llibert	FW	1	0	1
2	(Czech Republic) Jakub Podaný	MF	1	0	1
2	(Spain) Jofre Mateu	MF	1	0	1
2	(India) Baljit Sahni	FW	1	0	1
2	(Spain) Luis García	MF	2	0	1
Own goals			0	0	0
Total			10	0	10

=== Discipline ===
N	P	Nat.	Name	ISL			Others			Total			Notes
N	P	Nat.	Name	Yellow card	Second yellow card	Red card	Yellow card	Second yellow card	Red card	Yellow card	Second yellow card	Red card	Notes
8	MF	(Spain)	Borja Fernández	2	1					2	1		
20	MF	(India)	Rakesh Masih	1	1					1	1		
9	FW	(Ethiopia)	Fikru Tefera	2						2			Banned - Fikru Tefera 2 match suspension; Banned on 25 October 2014 - Sustain on this season
23	MF	(Botswana)	Ofentse Nato	1						1			
24	FW	(Spain)	Arnal Llibert	1						1			
2	DF	(India)	Biswajit Saha	1						1			
7	FW	(India)	Cavin Lobo	1						1			

Last updated: 3 November 2014
Source: Matches
Ordered by (red card) , (second yellow card) and (yellow card)
(yellow card) = Number of bookings; (second yellow card) = Number of sending offs after a second yellow card; (red card) = Number of sending offs by a direct red card.

== See also ==
- Atlético Madrid
- 2014 Indian Super League season
- 2014-15 Atlético Madrid season
