= List of ATK players =

Football club

ATK (previously known as Atlético de Kolkata), was an Indian football club based in Kolkata, West Bengal, that played in Indian Super League. It was established on 7 May 2014 as the first team in the Indian Super League, and played its home games at the Salt Lake Stadium. The club was merged with Mohun Bagan AC to form Mohun Bagan Super Giant on 1 June 2020.

== List of players ==
- Appearances and goals are for Indian Super League and Super Cup matches only.
- Players are listed according to the date of their first team debut for the club. Only players with at least one appearance are included.

Statistics correct as of 1 June 2020

Table headers

- Nationality – If a player played international football, the country/countries he played for are shown. Otherwise, the player's nationality is given as their country of birth.
- Career span – The year of the player's first appearance for ATK to the year of his last appearance.
- Matches – The total number of games played, both as a starter and as a substitute.

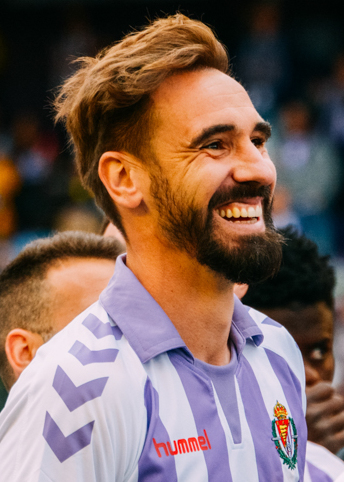
Borja Fernández is the most appeared player for ATK with 47 appearances and he also scalped goal twice.

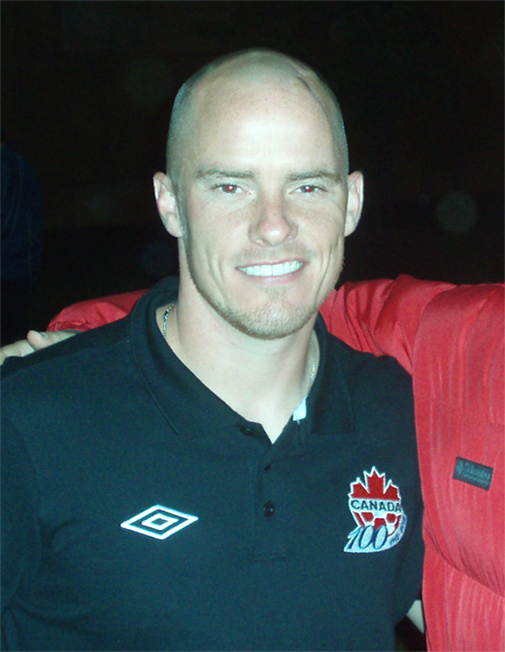
Hume is the all-time leading scorer for ATK with 18 goals.

Name	Nat	Pos	ATK career	Apps	Goals	Ref
Borja Fernández	(Spain)	Midfielder	2014–2016	47	2	
Luis García	(Spain)	Forward	2014–2015	13	2	
Ofentse Nato	(Botswana)	Midfielder	2014–2017	31	0	
Fikru Tefera	(Ethiopia)	Forward	2014	12	5	
Jofre	(Spain)	Midfielder	2014	12	1	
Josemi	(Spain)	Defender	2014–2015	20	0	
Arnal Llibert	(Spain)	Forward	2014	11	1	
Sylvain Monsoreau	(France)	Defender	2014	2	1	
Jakub Podaný	(Czech Republic)	Midfielder	2014	11	2	
Apoula Edel	(Armenia)	Goalkeeper	2014	9	0	
Mamunul Islam	(Bangladesh)	Midfielder	2014	0	0	
Basilio Sancho	(Spain)	Goalkeeper	2014	0	0	
Subhasish Roy Chowdhury	(India)	Goalkeeper	2014	8	0	
Biswajit Saha	(India)	Defender	2014	11	0	
Nallappan Mohanraj	(India)	Defender	2014–2016, 2017–2018	11	1	
Kingshuk Debnath	(India)	Defender	2014,2016	14	0	
Arnab Mondal	(India)	Defender	2014–2019	46	0	
Baljit Sahni	(India)	Forward	2014–2015	21	2	
Cavin Lobo	(India)	Forward	2014, 2018–2019	7	2	
Denzil Franco	(India)	Defender	2014–2016	10	0	
Mohammed Rafi	(India)	Forward	2014	10	0	
Sanju Pradhan	(India)	Midfielder	2014	11	0	
Climax Lawrence	(India)	Midfielder	2014	0	0	
Mohammed Rafique	(India)	Forward	2014–2015	7	1	
Rakesh Masih	(India)	Midfielder	2014	9	0	
Lester Fernandez	(India)	Midfielder	2014	9	0	
Juan Calatayud	(Spain)	Goalkeeper	2015	9	0	
Tiri	(Spain)	Defender	2015–2016, 2020–	24	0	
Jaime Gavilán	(Spain)	Midfielder	2015	16	0	
Valdo	(Cape Verde)	Midfielder	2015	9	1	
Sameehg Doutie	(South Africa)	Midfielder	2015–2016	26	5	
Jorge Alonso	(Spain)	Midfielder	2015	2	0	
Javi Lara	(Spain)	Midfielder	2015–2016	23	4	
Iain Hume	(Canada)	Forward	2015–2016	30	18	
Hélder Postiga	(Portugal)	Forward	2015–2016	12	4	
Dejan Lekić	(Serbia)	Forward	2015–2016	6	2	
Amrinder Singh	(India)	Goalkeeper	2015	13	0	
Kunzang Bhutia	(India)	Goalkeeper	2015,2017–2018	0	0	
Syed Rahim Nabi	(India)	Defender	2015	2	0	
Rino Anto	(India)	Defender	2015	13	0	
Augustin Fernandes	(India)	Defender	2015, 2017–2018	13	1	
Clifford Miranda	(India)	Midfielder	2015	1	0	
Jewel Raja	(India)	Midfielder	2015–2016	14	0	
Arata Izumi	(India)	Midfielder	2015–2016	11	5	
Nadong Bhutia	(India)	Forward	2015	2	0	
Sushil Kumar Singh	(India)	Forward	2015	5	0	
Dani Mallo	(Spain)	Goalkeeper	2016	2	0	
Shilton Paul	(India)	Goalkeeper	2016	0	0	
Debjit Majumder	(India)	Goalkeeper	2016–2019,	30	0	
Henrique Sereno	(Portugal)	Defender	2016	10	1	
Robert Lalthlamuana	(India)	Defender	2016	9	0	
Keegan Pereira	(India)	Defender	2016	25	0	
Prabir Das	(India)	Defender	2016–present	48	0	
Bikramjit Singh	(India)	Midfielder	2016	7	0	
Stephen Pearson	(Scotland)	Midfielder	2016	11	2	
Bidyananda Singh	(India)	Midfielder	2016	6	0	
Lalrindika Ralte	(India)	Midfielder	2016	13	1	
Pritam Kotal	(India)	Defender	2016,2018–present	42	1	
Bikash Jairu	(India)	Midfielder	2016	0	0	
Abhinas Ruidas	(India)	Midfielder	2016	9	0	
Juan Belencoso	(Spain)	Forward	2016	16	2	
Jussi Jääskeläinen	(Finland)	Goalkeeper	2017	1	0	
Jordi Figueras	(Spain)	Defender	2017–2018	17	0	
Tom Thorpe	(England)	Defender	2017–2018	11	1	
Anwar Ali	(India)	Defender	2017–2018	8	0	
Ryan Taylor	(England)	Defender	2017–2018	11	1	
Ashutosh Mehta	(India)	Defender	2017–2018	14	1	
Conor Thomas	(England)	Midfielder	2017–2018	20	0	
Eugeneson Lyngdoh	(India)	Midfielder	2017–2019	10	0	
Darren Caldeira	(India)	Midfielder	2017–2018	3	0	
Carl Baker	(England)	Midfielder	2017	0	0	
Rupert Nongrum	(India)	Midfielder	2017–2018	15	0	
Hitesh Sharma	(India)	Midfielder	2017–2020	30	1	
Zequinha	(Portugal)	Forward	2017–2018	15	3	
Jayesh Rane	(India)	Forward	2017–present	52	3	
Ronald Singh	(India)	Forward	2018	2	0	
Bipin Singh	(India)	Forward	2017–2018	14	2	
Robbie Keane	(Republic of Ireland)	Forward	2017–2018	11	8	
Njazi Kuqi	(Finland)	Forward	2017–2018	11	8	
Robin Singh	(India)	Forward	2017–2018	11	8	
David Cotterill	(Wales)	Forward	2018	3	0	
Martin Paterson	(Northern Ireland)	Forward	2018	6	1	
Soram Anganba	(India)	Goalkeeper	2018	7	0	
Sibongakonke Mbatha	(South Africa)	Midfielder	2018	5	1	
Soram Anganba	(India)	Goalkeeper	2018	7	0	
Arindam Bhattacharya	(India)	Goalkeeper	2018–present	38	0	
Avilash Paul	(India)	Goalkeeper	2018–present	0	0	
Sandeep Singh	(India)	Defender	2018–2019	0	0	
André Bikey	(Cameroon)	Defender	2018–2019	17	1	
Gérson	(Brazil)	Defender	2018–2019	21	1	
John Johnson	(England)	Defender	2018–present	24	1	
Sumit Rathi	(India)	Defender	2018–present	14	0	
Sena Ralte	(India)	Defender	2018–2019	2	0	
Ricky Lallawmawma	(India)	Defender	2018–2020	20	0	
Aiborlang Khongjee	(India)	Defender	2018–2019	7	0	
Ankit Mukherjee	(India)	Defender	2018–2019	11	1	
Noussair El Maimouni	(Morocco)	Midfielder	2018–2019	10	1	
Pronay Halder	(India)	Midfielder	2018–present	24	1	
Ashish Pradhan	(India)	Midfielder	2018–2020	0	0	
Raghav Gupta	(India)	Midfielder	2018–present	0	0	
Yumnam Singh	(India)	Midfielder	2018–present	0	0	
Edu García	(Spain)	Midfielder	2019–present	24	9	
H Lalmuankima	(India)	Forward	2019	0	0	
Manu Lanzarote	(Spain)	Forward	2018–2019	17	7	
Komal Thatal	(India)	Forward	2018–present	18	1	
Kalu Uche	(Nigeria)	Forward	2018–2019	11	1	
Éverton	(Brazil)	Forward	2018–2019	19	1	
Balwant Singh	(India)	Forward	2018–present	26	6	
Eli Babalj	(Australia)	Forward	2018–2019	3	0	
Dheeraj Singh	(India)	Goalkeeper	2019–present	1	0	
Arsh Anwer Shaikh	(India)	Goalkeeper	2019–present	0	0	
Anil Chawan	(India)	Defender	2019–present	0	0	
Víctor Mongil	(Spain)	Defender	2020–present	9	0	
Agus	(India)	Defender	2019–present	14	0	
Anas Edathodika	(India)	Defender	2019–present	9	0	
Salam Ranjan Singh	(India)	Defender	2019–present	3	0	
Mandi	(Spain)	Midfielder	2019–present	11	0	
Michael Regin	(India)	Midfielder	2019–present	7	0	
Sehnaj Singh	(India)	Midfielder	2019–present	8	0	
Javi Hernández	(Spain)	Midfielder	2019–present	20	2	
Michael Soosairaj	(India)	Midfielder	2019–present	20	3	
Roy Krishna	(Fiji)	Forward	2019–present	21	15	
David Williams	(Australia)	Forward	2019–present	18	7	
Carl McHugh	(Republic of Ireland)	Forward	2019–present	6	1	
Jobby Justin	(India)	Forward	2019–present	9	1	
