= 2014 FC Goa season =

2014 season of FC Goa

FC Goa
2014 season
- President: Dattaraj Salgaocar
- Head Coach: Zico
- Stadium: Fatorda Stadium
- ISL: 2nd
- Finals: Semi-finalist
- Top goalscorer: League: Miroslav Slepička (5); All: Miroslav Slepička (5)
- Highest home attendance: 19,752 vs. Kerala Blasters (26 November 2014)
- Lowest home attendance: 16,652 vs. Chennaiyin FC (15 October 2014)
- Average home league attendance: 18,066

The 2014 Season was FC Goa's first season in existence. The club competed in the inaugural edition of the Indian Super League finishing the regular season in second place and reaching the semi-finals of the play-offs.

== Background ==
In early 2014, it was announced that the All India Football Federation, the national federation for football in India, and IMG-Reliance would be accepting bids for ownership of eight of nine selected cities for the upcoming Indian Super League, an eight-team franchise league modeled along the lines of the Indian Premier League and Major League Soccer in the United States. On 13 April 2014, it was announced that Venugopal Dhoot had won the bidding for the Goa franchise along with Dattaraj Salgaocar and Shrinivas Dempo. On 23 September 2014 Virat Kohli Indian Cricketer was unveiled as one of the co-owners. The brand ambassador of the club is Bollywood actor Varun Dhawan. FC Goa is the first Indian sports club to launch a satellite TV Channel – FC Goa TV on Videocon D2H. On 20 September 2014 FC Goa officially confirmed Arsenal legend Robert Pires as their marquee player.

=== Season summary ===
FC Goa lost four out of their first six matches but came back strongly in the second half of the tournament with five victories from their last eight encounters keeping five clean sheets in their 14 matches. Overall, Zico has done a remarkable job with six wins, four defeats and three draws, which took them to the second spot of the standings with 22 points.

Match 1 lost to Chennayin FC 2–1 at home Balwant Singh (32') and Elano Blumer (42') gave the southerners a two-goal cushion in the first half, while Gregory Arnolin (65') managed to pull one back for the Goan franchise.

Match 2 drew to NorthEast United FC away Gregory Arnolin scored his second goal in as many matches to put FC Goa in an advantageous position only for the referee to award a controversial penalty which saw Koke convert from the spot to equalize in the first half for NorthEast United.

Match 3 lost to A de Kolkata 2–1 at home Andre Santos had put FC Goa ahead in the first half before Cavin Lobo struck twice in the second session for the Kolkata outfit.

Match 4 lost to Pune City FC 2–0 away A goal each from Kostas Katsouranis and David Trezeguet aided FC Pune City in their 2–0 victory over FC Goa.

Match 5 defeated Delhi Dynamos 2–1 away Tolgay Ozbey and Jewel Raja came to FC Goa’s rescue as they scored twice in the second half to help their side down Delhi Dynamos 2–1 after trailing by a Mads Junker goal for most of the game.

Match 6 lost to Kerala Blasters 1–0 away Milagres Gonsalves and Andrew Barisic combined brilliantly to give Kerala a win in their maiden home game with the former scoring the all-important goal in the 63rd minute.

Match 7 drew goalless to Mumbai at home Both sides created chances but failed to get off the mark as Mumbai moved up the table to fourth with the point.

Match 8 defeated Delhi Dynamos 4–1 away A brace by Youness Bengelloun, a Robert Pires spot-kick and a top strike by Tolgay Ozbey were enough to seal their first three points on the road. Gustavo Marmentini did pull one back for the home side after a penalty was awarded in the 73rd minute.

Match 9 was a 0-0 draw to Mumbai away.

Match 10 defeated Pune City FC 2–0 home. FC Goa took the lead early in the fifth minute through Romeo Fernandes and sealed the victory in injury time courtesy substitute Miroslav Slepicka.

Match 11 beat Kerala Blasters 3–0 at home Zico’s side avenged their away defeat as they trounced their opponents with a brace by Miroslav Slepicka while Andre Santos added the icing on the cake. All goals came in the second period.

Match 12 beat NorthEast United 3–0 at home Romeo Fernandes and Miroslav Slepicka put ahead FC Goa ahead in the first half while Andre Santos sealed three points after change of ends.

Match 13 defeated Channaiyin FC 3–1 away The hosts were handed their first defeat of the campaign of home soil by in-form FC Goa who scored again through ‘The Three Musketeers’ Romeo Fernandes, Andre Santos and Miroslav Slepicka. Jean-Eudes Maurice did pull one back for Chennaiyin Fc in stoppage time.

Match 14 drew 1–1 to A de Kolkata away The Kolkata giants could have been knocked out of the tournament if Edgar Marcelino’s wonder strike in the 27th minute would have remained. But, Atletico de Kolkata relied on little help from match referee B Toledo as Fikru equalized through the controversial penalty at the cost of Bruno Pinheiro’s sending off.

== Signings ==
=== Foreign signings ===
#	Position:	Player	Last club	Date	Source
7	MF	(France) Robert Pires	Retirement	2 September 2014	
18	DF	(Afghanistan) Zohib Islam Amiri	loan from (India) Dempo	26 September 2014	
25	FW	(Nigeria) Ranti Martins	loan from (India) East Bengal		
26	FW	(Australia) Tolgay Özbey	loan from (India) Dempo	26 September 2014	
27	DF	(Brazil) André Santos	(Brazil) Flamengo	29 September 2014	

=== Drafted domestic players ===
Round	Position	Player	I-League club
1	GK	(India) Laxmikant Kattimani	Dempo
2	DF	(India) Debabrata Roy	Dempo
3	MF	(India) Gabriel Fernandes	Dempo
4	MF	(India) Clifford Miranda	Dempo
5	MF	(India) Jewel Raja	Dempo
6	MF	(India) Alwyn George	Dempo
7	DF	(India) Narayan Das	Dempo
8	MF	(India) Mandar Rao Desai	Dempo
9	MF	(India) Romeo Fernandes	Dempo
10	MF	(India) Peter Carvalho	Dempo
11	FW	(India) Holicharan Narzary	Dempo
12	MF	(India) Pronay Halder	Dempo
13	DF	(India) Prabir Das	Dempo
14	DF	(India) Rowilson Rodrigues	Dempo

=== Drafted foreign players ===
Round	Position	Player	Last Club
1	FW	(Czech Republic) Miroslav Slepička	(Czech Republic) 1. FK Příbram
2	GK	(Czech Republic) Jan Šeda	(Czech Republic) Mladá Boleslav
3	DF	(Portugal) Bruno Pinheiro	(Greece) Niki Volos
4	DF	(France) Youness Bengelloun	(France) Mulhouse
5	FW	(Portugal) Miguel Herlein	(Portugal) Vilaverdense
6	DF	(Martinique) Grégory Arnolin	(Portugal) Paços de Ferreira
7	MF	(Portugal) Edgar Marcelino	(Oman) Al-Seeb

== Players and staff ==
=== Squad ===
As of 15 October 2014.

Note: Flags indicate national team as defined under FIFA eligibility rules; some limited exceptions apply. Players may hold more than one non-FIFA nationality.

No.	Pos.	Nation	Player
1	GK	CZE	Jan Šeda
2	DF	IND	Debabrata Roy
3	DF	IND	Narayan Das
4	DF	IND	Rowilson Rodrigues
5	DF	FRA	Youness Bengelloun
6	MF	IND	Peter Carvalho
7	MF	FRA	Robert Pires (Marquee player)
8	MF	IND	Alwyn George
9	FW	POR	Miguel Herlein
10	MF	POR	Edgar Marcelino
11	FW	IND	Holicharan Narzary
12	MF	IND	Bikramjit Singh
13	GK	IND	Gurpreet Chabal
14	MF	IND	Gabriel Fernandes

No.	Pos.	Nation	Player
15	DF	MTQ	Grégory Arnolin
16	DF	POR	Bruno Pinheiro
17	MF	IND	Mandar Rao Desai
18	DF	AFG	Zohib Islam Amiri
19	MF	IND	Romeo Fernandes
20	FW	CZE	Miroslav Slepička
21	GK	IND	Laxmikant Kattimani
22	DF	IND	Prabir Das
23	MF	IND	Jewel Raja
24	MF	IND	Clifford Miranda
25	FW	NGR	Ranti Martins
26	FW	AUS	Tolgay Özbey
27	DF	BRA	André Santos

=== Coaching staff ===
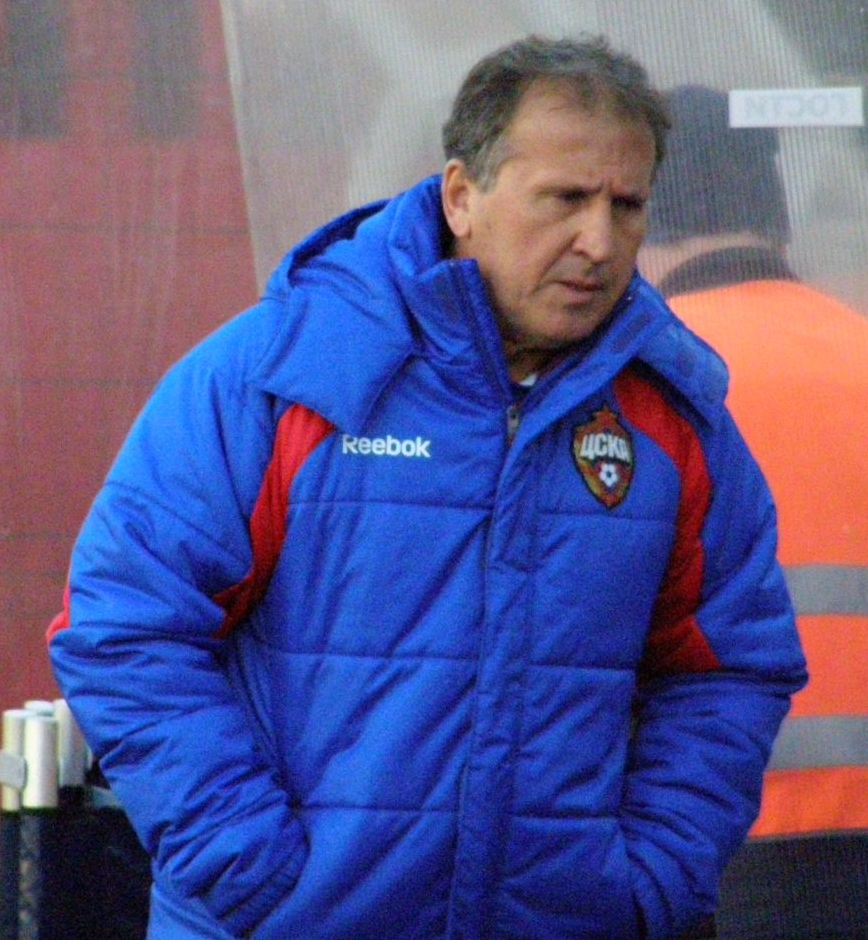
Zico manager of FC Goa

Position	Name
Head coach	(Brazil) Zico
Assistant coach	(Australia) Arthur Papas
Conditioning coach	(Australia) Hussein Skenderovic
Head of Youth Development	(India) Mariano Dias
Physiotherapist	(India) R Venkatesh
Assistant Physiotherapist	(India) Russell Pinto
Kit Manager	(India) Rajesh Malgi

== Indian Super League ==
=== Regular season ===
==== League table ====
Pos	Team	Pld	W	D	L	GF	GA	GD	Pts	Qualification
1	Chennaiyin	14	6	5	3	24	20	+4	23	Advance to ISL Play-offs
2	Goa	14	6	4	4	21	12	+9	22	Advance to ISL Play-offs
3	Atlético de Kolkata (C)	14	4	7	3	16	13	+3	19	Advance to ISL Play-offs
4	Kerala Blasters	14	5	4	5	9	11	−2	19	Advance to ISL Play-offs

Source: Soccerway
Rules for classification: 1) points; 2) goal difference; 3) number of goals scored
(C) Champions

==== Results summary ====
Overall								Home						Away					
Pld	W	D	L	GF	GA	GD	Pts	W	D	L	GF	GA	GD	W	D	L	GF	GA	GD
14	6	4	4	21	12	+9	22	4	1	2	12	5	+7	2	3	2	9	7	+2

Last updated: 17 September 2015.
Source: Matches

==== Results by round ====
Round	1	2	3	4	5	6	7	8	9	10	11	12	13	14
Ground	H	A	H	A	H	A	H	A	A	H	H	H	A	A
Result	L	D	L	L	W	L	D	W	D	W	W	W	W	D

Source: Matches
A = Away; H = Home; W = Win; D = Draw; L = Loss

==== Matches ====
15 October 2014 1	Goa	1–2	Chennaiyin	Goa
19:00 IST (UTC+5:30)	N.Das (yellow card) 45'; Grégory 65'	Report	Das (yellow card) 17'; B.Singh 32'; Elano (yellow card) 38' (goal) 42'; Devadas (yellow card) 51'	Stadium: Fatorda Stadium; Referee: Chris Penso

19 October 2014 2	NorthEast United	1–1	Goa	Guwahati
19:00 IST (UTC+5:30)	Chansa (yellow card) 16'; Koke 36' (pen.); Do (yellow card) 82'	Report	Grégory 17'	Stadium: Indira Gandhi Athletic Stadium; Referee: David Gantar

23 October 2014 3	Goa	1–2	Atlético de Kolkata	Goa
19:00 IST (UTC+5:30)	Santos 21' (yellow card) 52'; G.Fernandes (yellow card) 47'; Martins (yellow card) 69'	Report	Borja (yellow card) 12'; Teferra (yellow card) 33'; Lobo (yellow card) 52' (goal) 72', 84'; Saha (yellow card) 76'	Stadium: Fatorda Stadium; Referee: Chris Penso

26 October 2014 4	Pune City	2–0	Goa	Pune
19:00 IST (UTC+5:30)	Katsouranis (yellow card) 14' (goal) 42'; Bolado (yellow card) 54'; Trezeguet 81'	Report		Stadium: Shree Shiv Chhatrapati Sports Complex; Referee: Pratap Singh

1 November 2014 5	Goa	2–1	Delhi Dynamos	Goa
19:00 IST (UTC+5:30)	Grégory (yellow card) 14'; Roy (yellow card) 67'; Raja 73'; Amiri (yellow card) 90+1'; Özbey 90+3'	Report	Junker 7'; Houben (yellow card) 20'; Khan (yellow card) 60'; Marmentini (yellow card) 90+6'	Stadium: Fatorda Stadium; Referee: David Gantar

6 November 2014 6	Kerala Blasters	1–0	Goa	Kochi
19:00 IST (UTC+5:30)	Jhingan (yellow card) 52'; Gonsalves 64'; Orji (yellow card) 88'	Report		Stadium: Jawaharlal Nehru Stadium; Referee: Jarred Gillett

9 November 2014 7	Goa	0–0	Mumbai City	Goa
16:30 IST (UTC+5:30)	N.Das (yellow card) 24'; Bengelloun (yellow card) 45+5'; Singh (yellow card) 66'	Report	Costa (yellow card) 27'; Štohanzl (yellow card) 74'	Stadium: Fatorda Stadium; Referee: Jarred Gillett

13 November 2014 8	Delhi Dynamos	1–4	Goa	Delhi
19:00 IST (UTC+5:30)	Raymaekers (yellow card) 45+2'; Van Hout (yellow card) 52'; Marmentini 73' (pen.)	Report	Bengelloun 18', 48'; Singh (yellow card) 45'; Pires 53' (pen.); Özbey 60'	Stadium: Jawaharlal Nehru Stadium; Referee: Arumughan Rowan

17 November 2014 9	Mumbai City	0–0	Goa	Mumbai
19:00 IST (UTC+5:30)	Čmovš (yellow card) 73'	Report	Desai (yellow card) 28'; Grégory (yellow card) 71'	Stadium: DY Patil Stadium; Referee: Muringothumalil Bhaskaran Santosh Kumar

22 November 2014 14	Goa	2–0	Pune City	Goa
19:00 IST (UTC+5:30)	R.Fernandes 6'; Desai (yellow card) 30'; Santos (yellow card) 69'; Amiri (yellow card) 81'; Slepička 90+4'; Miranda (yellow card) 90+5'	Report	Ravanan (yellow card) 50'; Rodrigues (yellow card) 54'; Wadoo (yellow card) 90+1'	Stadium: Fatorda Stadium; Referee: Hettikankanamge Chrishantha Dilan Perera

26 November 2014 11	Goa	3–0	Kerala Blasters	Goa
19:00 IST (UTC+5:30)	Santos (yellow card) 31' (goal) 69'; Singh (yellow card) 48'; Slepička 63', 79'; Miranda (yellow card) 88'	Report	Franco (yellow card) 12'; Romey (yellow card) 28'; Hume (yellow card) 62'	Stadium: Fatorda Stadium; Referee: Ranjit Bakshi

1 December 2014 12	Goa	3–0	NorthEast United	Goa
19:00 IST (UTC+5:30)	R.Fernandes 34'; Slepička 45+1' (yellow card) 45+1'; Santos 74'; Das (yellow card) 79'; Roy (yellow card) 90+6'	Report	Sambou (yellow card) 36'	Stadium: Fatorda Stadium; Referee: Muringothumalil Bhaskaran Santosh Kumar

5 December 2014 13	Chennaiyin	1–3	Goa	Chennai
19:00 IST (UTC+5:30)	Mendy (yellow card) 14'; Cristian (yellow card) 14'; Maurice 90+3'	Report	Amiri (yellow card) 18'; R.Fernandes 23'; Singh (yellow card) 25'; Santos 41'; Slepička 62'	Stadium: Jawaharlal Nehru Stadium; Referee: Baldomero Toledo

10 December 2014 10	Atlético de Kolkata	1–1	Goa	Kolkata
19:00 IST (UTC+5:30)	Sahni (yellow card) 72'; Teferra 68' (pen.)	Report	Marcelino 27'; Pinheiro (red card) 66'	Stadium: Salt Lake Stadium; Referee: Baldomero Toledo

=== Indian Super League finals ===
14 December 2014 Semifinal 1st leg	Atlético de Kolkata	0–0	Goa	Kolkata
19:00 IST (UTC+5:30)		Report	Slepička (yellow card) 28'	Stadium: Salt Lake Stadium; Attendance: 53,173; Referee: Santosh Kumar

17 December 2014 Semifinal 2nd leg	Goa	0–0 (a.e.t.) (0–0 agg.) (2–4 p)	Atlético de Kolkata	Goa
19:00 IST (UTC+5:30)	Desai (yellow card) 64'	Report	Jofre (yellow card) 74'; Borja (yellow card) 85'	Stadium: Fatorda Stadium; Attendance: 19,012; Referee: Ravshan Irmatov
	Penalties
	Santos (penalty missed); Özbey (penalty scored); Amiri (penalty missed); Miranda (penalty scored)		Josemi (penalty scored); Rafi (penalty scored); Jofre (penalty scored); Borja (penalty scored)

== Squad statistics ==
As of Match played 10 December 2014

=== Appearances and goals ===
No.	Pos	Nat	Player	Total		Indian Super League		Indian Super League finals	
No.	Pos	Nat	Player	Apps	Goals	Apps	Goals	Apps	Goals
1	GK	(Czech Republic) CZE	Jan Šeda	14	0	12	0	2	0
2	DF	(India) IND	Debabrata Roy	15	0	13	0	2	0
3	DF	(India) IND	Narayan Das	14	0	13	0	1	0
4	DF	(India) IND	Rowilson Rodrigues	1	0	0+1	0	0	0
5	DF	(France) FRA	Youness Bengelloun	13	2	10+2	2	1	0
6	MF	(India) IND	Peter Carvalho	8	0	6	0	1+1	0
7	MF	(France) FRA	Robert Pires	8	1	8	1	0	0
8	MF	(India) IND	Alwyn George	1	0	0+1	0	0	0
9	FW	(Portugal) POR	Miguel Herlein	5	0	3+2	0	0	0
10	MF	(Portugal) POR	Edgar Marcelino	3	1	2+1	1	0	0
11	FW	(India) IND	Holicharan Narzary	3	0	1+2	0	0	0
12	MF	(India) IND	Bikramjit Singh	9	0	7	0	2	0
14	MF	(India) IND	Gabriel Fernandes	8	0	5+3	0	0	0
15	DF	(Martinique) MTQ	Grégory Arnolin	15	2	13	2	2	0
16	DF	(Portugal) POR	Bruno Pinheiro	14	0	9+4	0	1	0
17	MF	(India) IND	Mandar Rao Desai	11	0	9	0	2	0
18	DF	(Afghanistan) AFG	Zohib Islam Amiri	9	0	4+3	0	2	0
19	MF	(India) IND	Romeo Fernandes	11	3	7+2	3	2	0
20	FW	(Czech Republic) CZE	Miroslav Slepička	10	5	4+4	5	2	0
21	GK	(India) IND	Laxmikant Kattimani	2	0	2	0	0	0
22	DF	(India) IND	Prabir Das	1	0	1	0	0	0
23	MF	(India) IND	Jewel Raja	9	1	3+4	1	0+2	0
24	MF	(India) IND	Clifford Miranda	11	0	3+7	0	0+1	0
25	FW	(Nigeria) NGR	Ranti Martins	7	0	4+3	0	0	0
26	FW	(Australia) AUS	Tolgay Özbey	9	2	5+3	2	0+1	0
27	DF	(Brazil) BRA	André Santos	12	4	10	4	2	0

=== Goal scorers ===
Place	Position	Nation	Number	Name	Indian Super League	Indian Super League finals	Total
1	FW	(Czech Republic)	20	Miroslav Slepička	5	0	5
2	DF	(Brazil)	27	André Santos	4	0	4
3	MF	(India)	19	Romeo Fernandes	3	0	3
4	DF	(Martinique)	15	Grégory Arnolin	2	0	2
4	FW	(Australia)	26	Tolgay Özbey	2	0	2
4	DF	(France)	5	Youness Bengelloun	2	0	2
7	MF	(India)	23	Jewel Raja	1	0	1
7	MF	(France)	7	Robert Pires	1	0	1
7	MF	(Portugal)	10	Edgar Marcelino	1	0	1
				TOTALS	21	0	21

=== Disciplinary record ===
Number	Nation	Position	Name	Indian Super League		Indian Super League finals		Total	
Number	Nation	Position	Name	Yellow card	Red card	Yellow card	Red card	Yellow card	Red card
2	(India)	DF	Debabrata Roy	2	0	0	0	2	0
3	(India)	DF	Narayan Das	3	0	0	0	3	0
5	(France)	DF	Youness Bengelloun	1	0	0	0	1	0
12	(India)	MF	Bikramjit Singh	4	0	0	0	4	0
14	(India)	MF	Gabriel Fernandes	1	0	0	0	1	0
15	(Martinique)	DF	Grégory Arnolin	2	0	0	0	2	0
16	(Portugal)	DF	Bruno Pinheiro	0	1	0	0	0	1
17	(India)	MF	Mandar Rao Desai	2	0	1	0	3	0
18	(Afghanistan)	DF	Zohib Islam Amiri	3	0	0	0	3	0
20	(Czech Republic)	FW	Miroslav Slepička	1	0	1	0	2	0
24	(India)	MF	Clifford Miranda	2	0	0	0	2	0
25	(Nigeria)	FW	Ranti Martins	1	0	0	0	1	0
27	(Brazil)	DF	André Santos	3	0	0	0	3	0
			TOTALS	25	1	2	0	27	1

== See also ==
- FC Goa
- 2014 Indian Super League
