= 2014–15 East Bengal FC season =

Indian football club season

East Bengal
2014–15 season
- President: Dr Pranab Dasgupta
- Head-Coach: (India) Armando Colaco (until 19 February 2015) (Netherlands) Eelco Schattorie (from 20 February 2015)
- Ground: Salt Lake Stadium; Barasat Stadium; East Bengal Ground
- I-League: 4th
- Calcutta Football League: Champions
- Federation Cup: Group Stage
- AFC Cup: Group Stage
- Top goalscorer: League: Ranti Martins (17); All: Ranti Martins (30)
- Highest home attendance: 28136
- Lowest home attendance: 8356
- Average home league attendance: 21742
Home colours	Away kit colours

The 2014–15 season was East Bengal's 8th season in the I-League and 95th season in existence.

== Competitions ==
=== Overall ===
Competition	First match	Last match	Final position
Calcutta Football League	10 August 2014	16 September 2014	Champions
I-League	18 January 2015	30 May 2015	4th
Federation Cup	29 December 2014	6 January 2015	Group Stage
AFC Cup	24 February 2015	12 May 2015	Group Stage

=== Overview ===
Competition	Record							
Competition	Pld	W	D	L	GF	GA	GD	Win %
Calcutta Football League	10	8	1	1	27	8	+19	80.00
I-League	20	8	5	7	30	28	+2	40.00
Federation Cup	4	1	1	2	4	5	−1	25.00
AFC Cup	6	1	2	3	8	10	−2	16.67
Total	40	18	9	13	69	51	+18	45.00

Last updated: 31 May 2015
Source: Competitions

=== Calcutta Football League ===
==== Table ====
Pos	Team	Pld	W	D	L	GF	GA	GD	Pts	Qualification or relegation
1	East Bengal (C)	10	8	1	1	27	8	+19	25	Champion
2	Mohun Bagan	10	8	0	2	19	9	+10	24	
3	Tollygunge Agragami	10	7	1	2	24	7	+17	22	
4	Mohammedan	10	6	2	2	17	12	+5	20	
5	Army XI	10	6	1	3	19	13	+6	19	

Source: Soccerway
(C) Champions

==== Fixtures & results ====
Win Draw Loss

10 August 2014 1	East Bengal	0–1	Mohammedan Sporting	Kolkata
17:00 IST		Report	Imran Khan 26'	Stadium: Salt Lake Stadium; Referee: Ajit Dutta; Man of the Match: Arnab Das Sharma (Mohammedan Sporting)

19 August 2014 2	East Bengal	4–1	BNR	Kolkata
17:00 IST	Ranti Martins 2'; Baljit Sahni 31', 45+1'; Deepak Mondal 41'	Report	Kazeem 79'	Stadium: Salt Lake Stadium; Referee: Prabir Dhar; Man of the Match: Baljit Sahni (East Bengal)

23 August 2014 3	East Bengal	2–1	Aryan	Kolkata
17:00 IST	Arnab Mondal 70'; Subodh Kumar 90+4'	Report	Sagar Das 8'	Stadium: Salt Lake Stadium; Referee: Mrinangshu Bhattacharyya; Man of the Match: Subodh Kumar (East Bengal)

26 August 2014 4	East Bengal	1–1	Kalighat MS	Kolkata
17:00 IST	Harmanjot Khabra 3'	Report	Saurav Mollick 12'	Stadium: Salt Lake Stadium; Referee: Tanmoy Dhar; Man of the Match: Subham (Kalighat MS)

31 August 2014 5^{(KD)}	East Bengal	3–1	Mohun Bagan	Kolkata
17:00 IST	Ranti Martins 13' (pen.), 50'; Joaquim Abranches 43'	Report	C. S. Sabeeth 20'	Stadium: Salt Lake Stadium; Referee: Pranjal Banerjee; Man of the Match: Joaquim Abranches (East Bengal)

4 September 2014 6	East Bengal	4–1	Army XI	Kolkata
17:00 IST	Ranti Martins 28'; Dudu Omagbemi 56', 69', 87'	Report	Jain P. 71'	Stadium: Salt Lake Stadium; Referee: Animesh Biswas; Man of the Match: Dudu Omagbemi (East Bengal)

7 September 2014 7	East Bengal	1–0	Southern Samity	Kolkata
17:00 IST	Pralhad Roy 41'	Report	Suraj Mondal (yellow card) 28' (yellow-red card) 87'	Stadium: Barasat Stadium; Referee: Nanigopal Saha; Man of the Match: Pralhad Roy (East Bengal)

10 September 2014 8	East Bengal	4–1	Police A.C.	Kolkata
17:00 IST	Ranti Martins 41'; Dudu Omagbemi 42', 45+2'; Pralhad Roy 90+2'	Report	Nilkanta Paria 3'	Stadium: Salt Lake Stadium; Referee: Ajit Dutta; Man of the Match: Dudu Omagbemi (East Bengal)

13 September 2014 9	East Bengal	6–0	SAI Darjeeling	Kolkata
17:00 IST	Dudu Omagbemi 15', 26', 71'; Ranti Martins 24', 43'; Leo Bertos 77'	Report		Stadium: Salt Lake Stadium; Referee: Animesh Biswas; Man of the Match: Dudu Omagbemi (East Bengal)

16 September 2014 10	East Bengal	2–1	Tollygunge Agragami	Kolkata
17:00 IST	Pralhad Roy 26'; Ranti Martins 37'	Report	Bello Razaq 33'	Stadium: Salt Lake Stadium; Referee: Prabir Dhar; Man of the Match: Sukhwinder Singh (East Bengal)

=== I-League ===
==== Table ====
Pos	Team	Pld	W	D	L	GF	GA	GD	Pts	Qualification or relegation
2	Bengaluru	20	10	7	3	35	19	+16	37	Qualification for AFC Cup group stage (Note: Bengaluru FC, as the winner of 2014–15 Federation Cup, qualified for the 2016 AFC Cup)
3	Royal Wahingdoh	20	8	6	6	27	27	0	30	
4	East Bengal	20	8	5	7	30	28	+2	29 (Note: East Bengal ahead on goal difference, head-to-head record being the same; Pune 2–3 East Bengal East Bengal 1–2 Pune)	
5	Pune	20	8	5	7	24	26	−2	29	
6	Mumbai	20	5	9	6	22	27	−5	24 (Note: Mumbal ahead on head-to-head goal difference; Mumbai–Salgaocar 3–0, Salgaocar–Mumbai 3–1)	

Source: IndiaFooty.com
Rules for classification: 1) points; 2) head-to-head points; 3) head-to-head goal difference; 4) goal difference; 5) number of goals scored; 6) play-off match.

==== Fixtures & results ====
Win Draw Loss

18 January 2015 1	Sporting Club de Goa	1–1	East Bengal	Margao
19:00 IST	Ogba Kalu Nnanna 79'	Report	Ranti Martins 7'	Stadium: Fatorda Stadium; Referee: Vishnu Chauhan

28 January 2015 2	East Bengal	1–0	Bengaluru	Kolkata
19:00 IST	Abhinas Ruidas 53'	Report		Stadium: Salt Lake Stadium; Referee: C.R. Srikrishna

1 February 2015 3	East Bengal	2–1	Shillong Lajong	Kolkata
16:30 IST	Ranti Martins 29', 70'	Report	Cornell Glen 59'	Stadium: Salt Lake Stadium; Referee: Om Prakash Thakur

7 February 2015 4	Salgaocar	3–1	East Bengal	Margao
16:30 IST	Douhou Pierre 43'; Darryl Duffy 45+1'; Brian Mascarenhas 65'	Report	Dudu Omagbemi 77'	Stadium: Fatorda Stadium; Referee: Vishnu Chauhan

15 February 2015 5	East Bengal	1–1	Bharat	Kolkata
19:00 IST	Ranti Martins 41'	Report	Kris Bright 59'	Stadium: Salt Lake Stadium; Referee: Tejas Nagvenkar

17 February 2015 6^{(KD)}	East Bengal	1–1	Mohun Bagan	Kolkata
19:00 IST	Ranti Martins 31'	Report	Pierre Boya 24'	Stadium: Salt Lake Stadium; Referee: Pratap Singh

1 March 2015 7	Dempo	1–5	East Bengal	Margao
19:00 IST	Carlos Hernández 28' (pen.)	Report	Ranti Martins 1', 12', 60' (pen.), 64', 86'	Stadium: Fatorda Stadium; Referee: Umesh Bora

21 March 2015 8	East Bengal	2–2	Sporting Club de Goa	Kolkata
19:00 IST	Ranti Martins 31', 60'	Report	Anthony Wolfe 64', 77'	Stadium: Salt Lake Stadium; Referee: A. Meitei

28 March 2015 9^{(KD)}	Mohun Bagan	1–0	East Bengal	Kolkata
19:00 IST	Balwant Singh 47'	Report		Stadium: Salt Lake Stadium; Referee: Santosh Kumar

31 March 2015 10	Royal Wahingdoh	1–0	East Bengal	Shillong
19:00 IST	Godwin Franco 30'	Report		Stadium: Jawaharlal Nehru Stadium; Referee: C.R. Srikrishna

8 April 2015 11	Bharat	0–3	East Bengal	Pune
19:00 IST		Report	Dudu Omagbemi 17', 23'; Ranti Martins 71' (pen.)	Stadium: Balewadi Stadium; Referee: Santosh Kumar

11 April 2015 12	Pune	2–3	East Bengal	Pune
19:00 IST	Matthew Gonsalves 37'; Darko Nikač 63'	Report	Ranti Martins 18'; Harmanjot Khabra 47'; Dudu Omagbemi 55'	Stadium: Balewadi Stadium; Referee: Rabichandra Singh

18 April 2015 13	East Bengal	1–1	Mumbai	Kolkata
16:30 IST	Dudu Omagbemi 56'	Report	Joshimar 33' (pen.)	Stadium: Salt Lake Stadium; Referee: B. Balasubramanium

18 April 2015 14	East Bengal	1–0	Salgaocar	Kolkata
16:30 IST	Ranti Martins 55'	Report		Stadium: Salt Lake Stadium; Referee: Om Prakash Thakur

25 April 2015 15	East Bengal	3–1	Dempo	Kolkata
16:30 IST	Dudu Omagbemi 22'; Ranti Martins 25'; Shylo Malsawmtluanga 64'	Report	Tolgay Ozbey 84' (pen.)	Stadium: Salt Lake Stadium; Referee: Raktim Saha

3 May 2015 16	Bengaluru	3–0	East Bengal	Bengaluru
19:00 IST	Sean Rooney 31'; Sunil Chhetri 60'; Robin Singh 88'	Report		Stadium: Kanteerava Stadium; Referee: A. Rowan

17 May 2015 17	East Bengal	1–2	Pune	Kolkata
16:30 IST	Dudu Omagbemi 44'	Report	Ishfaq Ahmed 45+1'; Thongkhosiem Haokip 65'	Stadium: Barasat Stadium; Referee: B. Balasubramanium

20 May 2015 18	Mumbai	2–1	East Bengal	Mumbai
16:30 IST	Paresh Shivalkar 3'; Joshimar 14'	Report	Ranti Martins 42'	Stadium: Cooperage Ground; Referee: Vishnu Chauhan

24 May 2015 19	East Bengal	2–0	Royal Wahingdoh	Kolkata
16:30 IST	Dudu Omagbemi 45+2', 66'	Report		Stadium: Barasat Stadium; Referee: Rabichandra Singh

30 May 2015 20	Shillong Lajong	5–1	East Bengal	Shillong
16:30 IST	Zodingliana Ralte 20'; Cornell Glenn 48', 75', 80'; Seiminlen Doungel 70'	Report	Cavin Lobo 32'	Stadium: Jawaharlal Nehru Stadium; Referee: Vishnu Chauhan

=== Federation Cup ===
==== Group A ====
Team	Pld	W	D	L	GF	GA	GD	Pts
Dempo	4	3	1	0	8	2	+6	10
Sporting Goa	4	2	0	2	7	9	−2	6
East Bengal	4	1	1	2	4	5	−1	4
Royal Wahingdoh	4	1	1	2	4	5	−1	4
Mumbai	4	1	1	2	2	4	−2	4

==== Fixtures & results ====
Win Draw Loss

29 December 2014 Group Stage	Dempo	1–0	East Bengal	Margao
19:00 IST	Romeo Fernandes 40'	Report		Stadium: Fatorda Stadium; Referee: C.R. Srikrishna; Man of the Match: Romeo Fernandes (Dempo)

31 December 2014 Group Stage	Royal Wahingdoh	0–1	East Bengal	Margao
19:00 IST		Report	Dudu Omagbemi 90+6'	Stadium: Fatorda Stadium; Referee: C.R. Srikrishna; Man of the Match: Nikhil Bernard (Royal Wahingdoh)

2 January 2015 Group Stage	Mumbai	0–0	East Bengal	Margao
19:00 IST		Report		Stadium: Fatorda Stadium; Referee: C.R. Srikrishna; Man of the Match: Subhasish Roy Chowdhury (East Bengal)

6 January 2015 Group Stage	East Bengal	3–4	Sporting Club de Goa	Margao
19:00 IST	Ranti Martins 6' (pen.); Dudu Omagbemi 31'; Shylo Malsawmtluanga 36'	Report	Victorino Fernandes 1', 67', 78'; Anthony Wolfe 45+2'	Stadium: Fatorda Stadium; Referee: Pratap Singh; Man of the Match: Victorino Fernandes (Sporting Club de Goa)

=== AFC Cup ===
==== Group F ====
Pos	Team	Pld	W	D	L	GF	GA	GD	Pts	Qualification	JDT	KIT	EBG	BAL
1	(Malaysia) Johor Darul Ta'zim	6	5	0	1	11	3	+8	15	Advance to knockout stage	—	2–0	4–1	3–0
2	(Hong Kong) Kitchee	6	3	2	1	10	6	+4	11	Advance to knockout stage	2–0	—	2–2	3–0
3	(India) East Bengal	6	1	2	3	8	10	−2	5		0–1	1–1	—	3–0
4	(Singapore) Balestier Khalsa	6	1	0	5	3	13	−10	3		0–1	1–2	2–1	—

Source: AFC

==== Fixtures & results ====
Win Draw Loss

24 February 2015 Group Stage	Johor Darul Ta'zim	4–1	East Bengal	Johor Bahru
20:45 UTC+8	Nazrin 9'; Safiq 38' (pen.); Suppiah 47'; Safee 53'	Report	Martins 35'	Stadium: Larkin Stadium; Attendance: 12,212; Referee: Sivakorn Pu-Udom (Thailand)

10 March 2015 Group Stage	East Bengal	1–1	Kitchee	Kolkata
18:00 UTC+5:30	Martins 74'	Report	Belencoso 30'	Stadium: Salt Lake Stadium; Attendance: 3,501; Referee: Hiroyuki Kimura (Japan)

17 March 2015 Group Stage	Balestier Khalsa	2–1	East Bengal	Singapore
20:00 UTC+8	Jonathan Xu 6'; Krištić 19'	Report	Omagbemi 82'	Stadium: Jalan Besar Stadium; Attendance: 1,215; Referee: Kao Jung-fang (Chinese Taipei)

14 April 2015 Group Stage	East Bengal	3–0	Balestier Khalsa	Kolkata
18:00 UTC+5:30	B. Singh 22'; Hussein 71' (o.g.); Martins 75'	Report		Stadium: Salt Lake Stadium; Attendance: 1,500; Referee: Kim Dae-yong (South Korea)

28 April 2015 Group Stage	East Bengal	0–1	Johor Darul Ta'zim	Kolkata
18:00 UTC+5:30		Report	Gaikwad 6' (o.g.)	Stadium: Salt Lake Stadium; Attendance: 100; Referee: Nivon Robesh Gamini (Sri Lanka)

12 May 2015 Group Stage	Kitchee	2–2	East Bengal	Hong Kong
20:35 UTC+8	Lam Ka Wai 15'; Xu Deshuai 59'	Report	Martins 80'; Lobo 89'	Stadium: Mong Kok Stadium; Attendance: 1,372; Referee: Yousef Al-Marzouq (Kuwait)

== Statistics ==
=== Appearances ===
Players with no appearances are not included in the list.

Appearances for East Bengal in 2014–15 season
No.	Pos.	Nat.	Name	CFL		I League		Fed Cup		AFC Cup		Total	
No.	Pos.	Nat.	Name	Apps	Starts	Apps	Starts	Apps	Starts	Apps	Starts	Apps	Starts
Goalkeepers
1	GK	(India)	Abhijit Mondal	2	2	11	10			4	4	17	16
50	GK	(India)	Subhasish Roy Chowdhury			7	7	4	4	0	0	11	11
30	GK	(India)	Luis Barreto	2	2	3	3	0	0	2	2	7	7
26	GK	(India)	Abhra Mondal	6	6	0	0	0	0	0	0	6	6
Defenders
3	DF	(India)	Arnab Mondal	5	5	16	15	4	4	2	2	27	26
19	DF	(India)	Robert Lalthlamuana	2	2	14	13			4	4	20	19
12	DF	(India)	Deepak Mondal	3	3	13	7	1	1	5	5	22	16
4	DF	(Australia)	Milan Šušak			12	12	4	4	4	3	20	19
5	DF	(India)	Abhishek Das	7	7	10	10	3	3	1	1	21	21
16	DF	(India)	Gurwinder Singh	7	6	9	8	0	0	4	3	20	17
29	DF	(India)	Soumik Dey	5	4	7	6			1	1	13	11
27	DF	(India)	R Dhanarajan	4	4	1	1			1	1	6	6
2	DF	(India)	Raju Gaikwad	3	3	0	0	2	2	4	4	9	9
23	DF	(India)	Safar Sardar	6	6							6	6
	DF	(India)	Wasim Akram Mallick	1	0							1	0
Midfielders
7	MF	(India)	Harmanjot Khabra	3	3	18	17	2	2	5	5	28	27
14	MF	(India)	Mehtab Hossain	5	5	16	16	4	4	4	4	29	29
24	MF	(India)	Cavin Lobo	4	4	14	11	4	4	1	0	23	19
28	MF	(India)	Shylo Malsawmtluanga	3	1	14	11	3	1	6	4	26	17
8	MF	(India)	Mohammed Rafique	3	1	11	3	3	1	6	6	23	11
11	MF	(New Zealand)	Leo Bertos	5	2	11	8	3	3	2	1	21	14
20	MF	(India)	Lalrindika Ralte	0	0	7	7	2	2	1	1	10	10
22	MF	(India)	Sukhwinder Singh	6	6	7	4			4	2	17	12
34	MF	(India)	Abhinash Ruidas	5	5	7	5			0	0	12	10
17	MF	(India)	Joaquim Abranches	4	4	7	2	3	1	4	3	18	10
32	MF	(India)	Baldeep Singh	0	0	4	0			3	2	7	2
18	MF	(India)	Subodh Kumar	6	5	3	0			2	2	11	7
40	MF	(India)	Prohlad Roy	5	4	0	0					5	4
	MF	(India)	Dipak Tirkey	3	2							3	2
	MF	(India)	Kissan Bag	3	0							3	0
35	MF	(India)	Anthony Soren	2	0							2	0
Forwards
10	FW	(Nigeria)	Ranti Martins	10	10	20	20	4	4	6	4	40	38
15	FW	(Nigeria)	Dudu Omagbemi	6	5	18	17	4	4	5	4	33	30
6	FW	(India)	Baljit Singh Sahni	3	2	5	2	4	0	4	2	16	6
26	FW	(India)	Jiten Murmu	2	1							2	1
	FW	(India)	Manas Sarkar	2	0							2	0

=== Goal scorers ===
Goals for East Bengal in 2014–15 season
Rank	No.	Pos.	Nat.	Name	CFL	I League	IFA Shield	AFC Cup	Total
1	10	FW	(Nigeria)	Ranti Martins	8	17	1	4	30
2	15	FW	(Nigeria)	Dudu Omagbemi	8	9	2	1	20
3	40	MF	(India)	Prohlad Roy	3	0			3
4	6	FW	(India)	Baljit Singh Sahni	2	0	0	0	2
4	7	MF	(India)	Harmanjot Khabra	1	1	0	0	2
4	24	MF	(India)	Cavin Lobo	0	1	0	1	2
4	28	MF	(India)	Shylo Malsawmtluanga	0	1	1	0	2
8	3	DF	(India)	Arnab Mondal	1	0	0	0	1
8	11	MF	(New Zealand)	Leo Bertos	1	0	0	0	1
8	12	DF	(India)	Deepak Mondal	1	0	0	0	1
8	17	MF	(India)	Joaquim Abranches	1	0	0	0	1
8	18	MF	(India)	Subodh Kumar	1	0		0	1
8	32	MF	(India)	Baldeep Singh	0	0		1	1
8	34	MF	(India)	Abhinash Ruidas	0	1		0	1
Own Goals					0	0	0	1	1
Total					27	30	4	8	69
