= Antonio López (footballer, born 1957) =

Spanish football player/manager

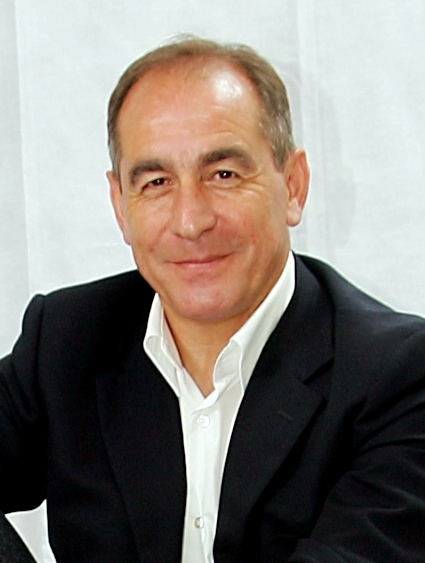
- López in 2012

Personal information
- Full name: Antonio López Habas
- Date of birth: 28 May 1957 (age 69)
- Place of birth: Pozoblanco, Spain
- Height: 1.70 m (5 ft 7 in)
- Position: Defender

Team information
- Current team: East Bengal (head coach)

Senior career*
Years	Team	Apps	(Gls)
1976–1977	Pozoblanco		
1977–1978	Sevilla B	28	(6)
1978–1980	Sevilla	8	(0)
1980–1982	Burgos	45	(14)
1982–1985	Murcia	74	(11)
1985–1986	Atlético Madrid	0	(0)
Total		155	(31)

Managerial career
- 1990–1991: Atlético Madrileño
- 1991–1992: Las Rozas
- 1992–1993: Aranjuez
- 1993–1994: Bolivia (assistant)
- 1994–1995: Bolívar
- 1995: Bolivia
- 1995–1996: Lleida
- 1996–1997: Bolivia
- 1998: Sporting Gijón
- 2000–2001: Bolívar
- 2001–2003: Valencia (assistant)
- 2005: Valencia
- 2005: Tenerife
- 2007–2008: Celta (assistant)
- 2008: Celta
- 2009–2010: Mamelodi Sundowns (assistant)
- 2010–2011: Mamelodi Sundowns
- 2012–2013: Bidvest Wits
- 2014–2016: ATK
- 2016–2017: Pune City
- 2019–2020: ATK
- 2020–2021: ATK Mohun Bagan
- 2024: Mohun Bagan (interim)
- 2024–2026: Inter Kashi
- 2026–: East Bengal
- * Club domestic league appearances and goals

Antonio López Habas (born 28 May 1957) is a Spanish professional football manager and former player who played as a defender. He is currently the head coach of Indian Super League club East Bengal.

== Playing career ==
Born in Pozoblanco, Córdoba, López had an unassuming career as a professional footballer, appearing in 48 La Liga matches over four seasons, eight of those for Sevilla to where he arrived in 1977 from local amateurs Pozoblanco, first being assigned to the B team.

He also represented Real Murcia, Burgos and Atlético Madrid (no appearances for the latter), retiring from the game at only 29 years of age due to a knee injury. In 1981–82 he scored an astonishing 13 goals in 32 games for Burgos, which nonetheless suffered Segunda División relegation due to financial irregularities.

== Coaching career ==
López started coaching in the early 1990s, with Atlético's reserves. After one season apiece in amateur football, also in the Madrid area, he took charge of the Bolivia national team, first as an assistant to Xabier Azkargorta, and eventually appeared with it them as head coach at two Copa América tournaments. He then returned to club action with Club Bolívar, followed by a spell in his homeland with Lleida in the second tier; whilst at the Catalan side, he briefly accumulated with his work as the national coach of the South American country, which he left for good in 1997 to sign with Sporting de Gijón of the Spanish second tier, being dismissed shortly after his arrival.

In summer 2001, López was hired by Valencia as assistant to Rafael Benítez. However, after the sacking of Italian Claudio Ranieri, he managed the first team for 14 games as the Che, the previous league champions, eventually finished seventh. Additionally, he worked at the Mestalla Stadium as youth system coordinator.

López became Tenerife's second head coach of the following campaign in November 2005, being fired himself after only six second-division matches. Two years later, he joined Hristo Stoichkov's staff at Celta de Vigo in the same tier. With the Galicians constantly battling relegation until the last month of competition, he was named interim coach for the final three months as the team eventually stayed afloat; he was the third manager for the club in approximately one year, after replacing Juan Ramón López Caro.

In 2010–11 López, who was assistant to Stoichkov at Mamelodi Sundowns of the South African Premier Division, took over the reins of the senior team. They made their best-ever start to a season and topped the standings at the end of the first round, eventually staying in contention for the league title until the second-last match; he resigned in February citing personal reasons, and went back to Spain.

In January 2012, López was appointed director of the Target Football Academy in Bangkok, Thailand. On 13 July he signed for South African club Bidvest Wits, agreeing to a two-year contract but leaving on 4 January of the following year.

In August 2014, after a short spell in Atlético Madrid's youth system, López was named coach of ATK in the Indian Super League. On 25 October he was given a four-match suspension and fined ₹5,00,000 for his involvement in a spat with Goa's Robert Pires, which was reduced to two upon appeal.

After a dip in form from midway through the season, López led his team to the semi-finals by drawing with Goa, meeting the same opponent once again and defeating them on penalties. In the decisive match, against Kerala Blasters, he benched marquee player Luis García and also-compatriot Jofre, for which he was praised by critics, and the side won thanks to a goal by Mohammed Rafique in extra time.

On 25 April 2016, López was appointed at fellow top-tier club Pune City. On 16 September 2017, after a run-in with the board of directors, he left his position.

In May 2019, López returned to ATK. On 14 March 2020, in a final played behind closed doors, he won the national championship against Chennaiyin to become the first manager to achieve the feat twice with the same team.

López signed with ATK Mohun Bagan on 15 March 2020. In his first season his side finished level with Mumbai City in the first stage, but pushed down to second place on head-to-head points and lost the final 2–1. On 3 April 2021, he agreed to a one-year contract extension, but resigned on 18 December after a poor run of results.

López returned to Mohun Bagan – now renamed Mohun Bagan Super Giant due to sponsorship reasons – in June 2023, as technical director. He was appointed their interim head coach the following 3 January, after the sacking of Juan Ferrando.

On 25 July 2024, López signed as manager of I-League club Inter Kashi. He initially finished second in his debut campaign, but a final ruling by the Court of Arbitration for Sport saw them surpass Churchill Brothers to win the championship and secure promotion.

López left Inter on 11 May 2026, with contract renewal talks having stalled due to uncertainty over the next season's ISL structure. On 6 July, he became head coach of East Bengal.

== Managerial statistics ==
As of match played 5 October 2026

Managerial record by team and tenure
Team	From	To	Record					Ref.
Team	From	To	M	W	D	L	Win %	Ref.
Atlético Madrileño	1990	1991	9	2	3	4	22.22	
Aranjuez	1992	1993	23	7	5	11	30.43	
Bolivia	1995	1995	10	2	4	4	20.00	
Lleida	1995	1996	22	7	6	9	31.82	
Bolivia	1996	1997	21	9	4	8	42.86	
Sporting Gijón	1998	1998	9	1	3	5	11.11	
Valencia	25 February 2005	30 June 2005	14	4	8	2	28.57	
Tenerife	14 November 2005	21 December 2005	6	0	3	3	0.00	
Celta	2008	2008	9	2	2	5	22.22	
Mamelodi Sundowns	4 June 2010	5 February 2011	18	11	2	5	61.11	
Bidvest Wits	12 July 2012	4 January 2013	16	4	7	5	25.00	
ATK	8 July 2014	20 December 2015	33	13	11	9	39.39	
Pune City	25 April 2016	15 September 2017	14	4	4	6	28.57	
ATK	3 May 2019	31 May 2020	21	12	4	5	57.14	
ATK Mohun Bagan	10 July 2020	18 December 2021	33	17	8	8	51.52	
Mohun Bagan (interim)	3 January 2024	31 May 2024	12	8	2	2	66.67	
Inter Kashi	25 July 2024	11 May 2026	32	15	8	9	46.88	
East Bengal	6 July 2026		10	6	2	2	60.00	
Total			312	124	86	102	39.74	

== Honours ==
=== Player ===
Murcia

- Segunda División: 1982–83

=== Manager ===
Bolivia

- Copa América runner-up: 1997

ATK

- Indian Super League: 2014, 2019–20

Mohun Bagan Super Giant

- Indian Super League Winner's Shield: 2023–24

Inter Kashi

- I-League: 2024–25

East Bengal

- Durand Cup: 2026
