= Ofentse Nato =

Botswana footballer

Personal information
- Date of birth: 1 October 1989 (age 37)
- Place of birth: Ramotswa, Botswana
- Height: 1.77 m (5 ft 9 1/2 in)
- Position: Defensive midfielder

Team information
- Current team: Extension Gunners

Senior career*
Years	Team	Apps	(Gls)
2008–2012	Gaborone United		
2012–2014	Bidvest Wits	16	(7)
2013	→ Mpumalanga Black Aces (loan)	25	(11)
2014	→ Atletico de Kolkata (loan)	16	(0)
2015–2016	Atletico de Kolkata	14	(0)
2016	→ Township Rollers (loan)		
2017–2022	Township Rollers		
2022–	Extension Gunners	20+	(3+)

International career^{‡}
2009–2017	Botswana	63	(4)
- * Club domestic league appearances and goals as of 15 November 2022 ‡ National team caps and goals as of 15 November 2022

Ofentse Nato (born 1 October 1989) is a Motswana professional footballer who plays as a defensive midfielder for Botswana Premier League club Extension Gunners and the Botswana national team.

== Club career ==
He began his professional career at a Botswana local team Gaborone United. After spending four years at the club, he joined South African club Bidvest Wits in July 2012 on a two-year deal. Nato joined Mpumalanga Black Aces on loan for the 2013–14 PSL season.

In 2014 it was announced that he would be loaned to the Spanish capital, where he will join the defending Spanish champions on a two-year loan deal. However, he would be loaned to Madrid's satellite club in the Indian Super League, Atletico de Kolkata, for a 12-week period on his arrival, where he will be under the guidance of former Wits and Mamelodi Sundowns coach, Antonio Lopez Habas.

== International ==
=== International goals ===
Scores and results list Botswana's goal tally first.

No	Date	Venue	Opponent	Score	Result	Competition
1.	9 June 2012	University of Botswana Stadium, Gaborone, Botswana	South Africa	1–1	1–1	2014 FIFA World Cup qualification
2.	15 June 2013	Lobatse Stadium, Lobatse, Botswana	Central African Republic	3–2	3–2	2014 FIFA World Cup qualification
3.	5 March 2014	Botswana National Stadium, Gaborone, Botswana	South Sudan	3–0	3–0	Friendly
4.	29 March 2015	Lobatse Stadium, Lobatse, Botswana	Mozambique	1–0	1–2	Friendly

== Honours ==
Atlético de Kolkata

- Indian Super League: 2014, 2016
