= 2014 CFL Premier Division =

Calcutta Football League season

CFL Premier Division A
- Season: 2014–15
- Champions: East Bengal (36th title)

The 2014 Calcutta Football League Premier Division A was the 116th season of the CFL Premier Division, a state league within the Indian state of West Bengal. The season kicked off on 16 September 2014.

East Bengal won the title for a record 36th time and also created a record by clinching the title for the 5th consecutive time.

== Standings ==
Pos	Team	Pld	W	D	L	GF	GA	GD	Pts	Qualification or relegation
1	East Bengal (C)	10	8	1	1	27	8	+19	25	Champion
2	Mohun Bagan	10	8	0	2	19	9	+10	24	
3	Tollygunge Agragami	10	7	1	2	24	7	+17	22	
4	Mohammedan	10	6	2	2	17	12	+5	20	
5	Army XI	10	6	1	3	19	13	+6	19	
6	Kalighat MS	10	3	4	3	14	15	−1	13	
7	Southern Samity	10	2	2	6	8	20	−12	8	
8	Bengal Nagpur Railway	10	1	4	5	10	19	−9	7	
9	Police A.C.	10	1	3	6	5	18	−13	6	
10	SAI Darjeeling (R)	10	1	2	7	9	22	−13	5	Relegation to Group B
11	Aryan (R)	10	0	4	6	5	14	−9	4	Relegation to Group B

Source: Soccerway
(C) Champions; (R) Relegated

== Results ==
Home \ Away	ARM	ARN	BNR	KEB	KMS	MSC	MMB	PAC	SAI	SOU	TOL
Army XI	—	3–1	1–0	1–4	5–0	2–1	4–2	1–1	2–0	2–0	2–1
Aryan	1–3	—	2–2	1–2	0–0	0–2	0–1	0–0	1–1	0–1	0–2
Bengal Nagpur Railway	0–1	2–2	—	1–4	1–1	1–1	1–2	0–0	1–4	3–1	0–3
East Bengal	4–1	2–1	4–1	—	1–1	0–1	3–1	4–1	6–0	1–0	2–1
Kalighat MS	0–5	0–0	1–1	1–1	—	1–3	0–2	6–1	3–2	2–0	0–0
Mohammedan	1–2	2–0	1–1	1–0	3–1	—	2–1	1–0	1–0	2–2	3–5
Mohun Bagan	1–2	1–0	2–1	1–3	2–0	1–2	—	3–0	1–0	3–1	1–0^{1}
Police A.C.	1–1	0–0	0–0	1–4	1–6	0–1	0–3	—	1–0	0–1	1–2
SAI Darjeeling	0–2	1–1	4–1	0–6	2–3	0–1	0–1	0–1	—	2–2	0–4
Southern Samity	0–2	1–0	1–3	0–1	0–2	2–2	1–3	1–0	2–2	—	0–5
Tollygunge Agragami	1–2	2–0	3–0	1–2	0–0	3–5	0–1	2–1	4–0	5–0	—

Source: Soccerway
Legend: Blue = home team win; Yellow = draw; Red = away team win.

== Top scorers ==
As of 16 September 2014

Source:kolkatafootball.com

8 goals

- (Nigeria) Dudu Omagbemi (East Bengal)
- (India) Balwant Singh (Mohun Bagan)

7 goals

- (Nigeria) Ranti Martins (East Bengal)

5 goals

- (India) Ashim Biswas (Tollygunge Agragami)
- (Cameroon) Pierre Boya (Mohun Bagan)
- (Nigeria) Oluwaunmi Somide (Tollygunge Agragami)

4 goals

- (Nigeria) Koko Sakibo (Tollygunge Agragami)

3 goals

- (Japan) Taro Hasegawa (Mohammedan)
