= Jofre Mateu =

Spanish footballer (born 1980)

Jofre
Personal information
- Full name: Jofre Mateu González
- Date of birth: 24 January 1980 (age 46)
- Place of birth: Alpicat, Spain
- Height: 1.71 m (5 ft 7 in)
- Position: Midfielder

Youth career
- 1995–1997: Barcelona

Senior career*
Years	Team	Apps	(Gls)
1997–1998	Barcelona C	27	(9)
1997–2002	Barcelona B	101	(12)
1998–2002	Barcelona	2	(1)
2000–2001	→ Mallorca B (loan)	34	(5)
2002–2005	Levante	101	(11)
2005–2006	Espanyol	12	(0)
2006–2008	Murcia	47	(4)
2008–2010	Rayo Vallecano	65	(5)
2010–2012	Valladolid	69	(5)
2012–2014	Girona	59	(4)
2014	ATK	12	(1)
2015–2016	Goa	23	(6)
Total		553	(63)

International career
1998–1999	Spain U18	10	(1)
- * Club domestic league appearances and goals

Jofre Mateu González (born 24 January 1980), known simply as Jofre, is a Spanish former professional footballer who played as a left midfielder.

He amassed Segunda División totals of 332 games and 28 goals over 11 seasons, in representation of six clubs. In La Liga, he appeared for Barcelona, Levante, Espanyol and Murcia.

Before retiring, Jofre spent three years in the Indian Super League.

== Club career ==
Born in Alpicat, Lleida, Catalonia, Jofre was a product of Barcelona's prolific youth system. He made his first-team debut on 15 May 1998 (the last round of the season), scoring as a substitute in a 1–4 home loss against Salamanca; playing mainly with the B team, he only made one more appearance with the main squad, four years later.

In 2002, Jofre joined Segunda División side Levante, being instrumental in their 2004 promotion to La Liga. He appeared in 27 league games the following campaign, which ended in relegation.

Jofre returned to his native region and the top flight with Espanyol, but played almost no part in a team that narrowly avoided relegation. He then moved to Real Murcia, contributing three league goals to another top-tier promotion.

In August 2008, Jofre signed with Rayo Vallecano, recently promoted to division two. He started during most of his spell in Madrid, and continued to compete in that league subsequently, being first choice with Real Valladolid and Girona.

On 26 August 2014, aged 34, Jofre moved abroad for the first time in his career, being drafted by ATK in the inaugural season of the Indian Super League. He scored his first goal for his new club on 19 October, converting a penalty kick in a 1–1 draw against Delhi Dynamos after Fikru Teferra had been fouled inside the box.

Jofre joined another team in the Indian top division for the 2015 campaign, Goa.

== Career statistics ==
Appearances and goals by club, season and competition
Club	Season	League			Cup		Other		Total	
Club	Season	Division	Apps	Goals	Apps	Goals	Apps	Goals	Apps	Goals
Barcelona B	1996–97	Segunda División	1	0	—		—		1	0
Barcelona B	1997–98	Segunda División B	7	1	—		6 (Note: Appearances in Segunda División B play-offs)	3	13	4
Barcelona B	1998–99	Segunda División	31	2	—		—		31	2
Barcelona B	1999–2000	Segunda División	28	3	—		—		28	3
Barcelona B	2001–02	Segunda División B	34	6	—		5	0	39	6
Barcelona B	Total		101	12	—		11	3	112	15
Barcelona	1997–98	La Liga	1	1	0	0	0	0	1	1
Barcelona	2001–02	La Liga	1	0	0	0	0	0	1	0
Barcelona	Total		2	1	0	0	0	0	2	1
Mallorca B	2000–01	Segunda División B	35	5	—		—		35	5
Levante	2002–03	Segunda División	37	5	1	0	—		38	5
Levante	2003–04	Segunda División	37	4	4	0	—		41	4
Levante	2004–05	La Liga	27	2	2	1	—		29	3
Levante	Total		101	11	7	1	—		108	12
Espanyol	2005–06	La Liga	12	0	5	2	4 (Note: Appearances in UEFA Cup)	1	21	3
Murcia	2006–07	Segunda División	33	3	0	0	—		33	3
Murcia	2007–08	La Liga	14	1	2	0	—		16	1
Murcia	Total		47	4	2	0	—		49	4
Rayo Vallecano	2008–09	Segunda División	33	3	4	0	—		37	3
Rayo Vallecano	2009–10	Segunda División	32	2	2	0	—		34	2
Rayo Vallecano	Total		65	5	6	0	—		74	5
Valladolid	2010–11	Segunda División	32	2	4	1	2 (Note: Appearances in La Liga play-offs)	0	38	3
Valladolid	2011–12	Segunda División	37	3	2	1	4	1	43	5
Valladolid	Total		69	5	6	2	6	1	81	8
Girona	2012–13	Segunda División	34	4	0	0	2	0	36	4
Girona	2013–14	Segunda División	25	0	4	0	—		29	0
Girona	Total		59	4	4	0	2	0	65	4
ATK	2014	Indian Super League	12	1	—		—		12	1
Goa	2015	Indian Super League	12	4	—				12	4
Goa	2016	Indian Super League	11	2	—				11	2
Goa	Total		23	6	—				23	6
Career total			526	54	30	5	23	5	579	64

== Honours ==
Barcelona

- La Liga: 1997–98

Espanyol

- Copa del Rey: 2005–06

ATK

- Indian Super League: 2014
