= Jan Šeda =

Czech footballer

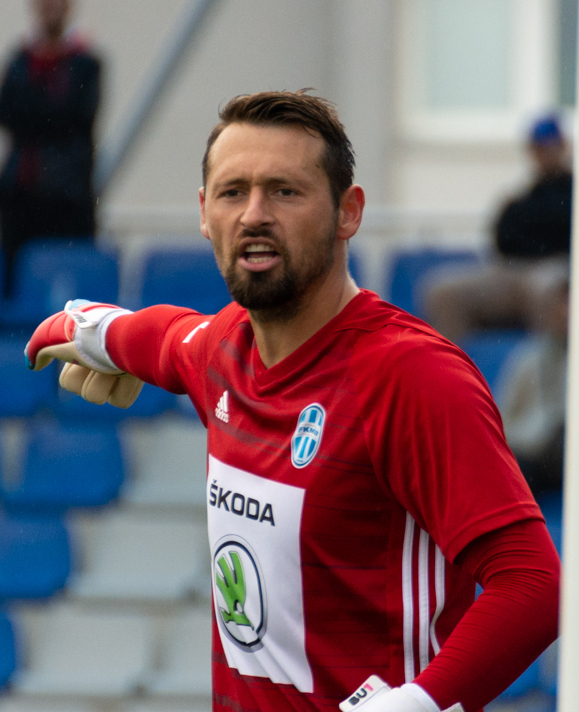
- Šeda with Mladá Boleslav in 2018

Personal information
- Date of birth: 17 December 1985 (age 40)
- Place of birth: Vysoké Mýto, Czechoslovakia
- Height: 1.89 m (6 ft 2 in)
- Position: Goalkeeper

Youth career
- AS Pardubice

Senior career*
Years	Team	Apps	(Gls)
2005–2025	Mladá Boleslav	188	(0)
2013–2014	→ RKC Waalwijk (loan)	23	(0)
2014	→ Goa (loan)	14	(0)
2017	→ Teplice (loan)	0	(0)
- * Club domestic league appearances and goals

Jan Šeda (born 17 December 1985) is a Czech football coach of goalkeepers and former professional footballer who played as a goalkeeper. During his active career, he played 188 matches for the Czech First League club Mladá Boleslav.

== Playing career ==
Šeda signed for FK Mladá Boleslav in 2005, winning the Czech Cup with his side in 2011 and 2016. He made his Czech First League debut on 4 May 2008, in a 2–1 away win against Teplice. Although he was on loan several times, he played for the club his entire career until his retirement in 2025. He played his last match for Mladá Boleslav on 16 April 2023. He became a notable personality of the club with 188 appearances for the club (5th most in the club's first league history as of 2025) and 51 clean sheets (2nd most).

=== Loans ===
Šeda joined Dutch side RKC Waalwijk on a season-long loan in July 2013. Šeda made 23 appearances for Waalwijk.

Šeda joined FC Goa on loan for the 2014 Indian Super League. He made 14 appearances for the club and was awarded the Golden Glove for his league-high seven clean sheets in the tournament.

In October 2017, Šeda joined Czech side FK Teplice after an injury to Teplice goalkeeper Tomáš Grigar. He left the club without making a league appearance.

== Coaching career ==
In 2025, Šeda ended his playing career and became a goalkeeping coach in FK Dukla Prague.

== Honours ==
Mladá Boleslav

- Czech Cup: 2010–11, 2015–16; runner-up: 2012–13

Individual

- Indian Super League Golden Glove: 2014
