= Anthony Soren =

Indian footballer

Personal information
- Date of birth: 29 January 1988 (age 38)
- Place of birth: Kharagpur, West Bengal, India
- Height: 1.76 m (5 ft 9 1/2 in)
- Position: Midfielder

Team information
- Current team: Mohammedan S.C.
- Number: 6

Senior career*
| Years | Team | Apps | (Gls) |
| 2013–2014 | Mohammedan | 8 | (0) |
| 2015– | East Bengal F.C. | | |
- * Club domestic league appearances and goals as of 20 December 2015

Anthony Soren (born 19 January 1988) is an Indian professional footballer who plays as a striker for Mohammedan S.C. in the I-League.

== Career ==
=== Mohammedan ===
Soren made his professional debut for Mohammedan in the I-League on 6 October 2013 against Salgaocar at the Duler Stadium; in which he played till 60th minute before being replaced by Jerry Zirsanga; as Mohammedan lost the match 3–0.

=== East Bengal ===
He started playing for the Kolkata giant in 2015.

== Career statistics ==
As of 27 April 2014

| Club | Season | League | | | Federation Cup | | Durand Cup | | AFC | | Total | | |
| Club | Season | Apps | Goals | Apps | Goals | Apps | Goals | Apps | Goals | Apps | Goals | | |
|---|---|---|---|---|---|---|---|---|---|---|---|---|---|
| Mohammedan | 2013–14 | 8 | 0 | 2 | 0 | 0 | 0 | - | - | 10 | 0 | | |
| Mohammedan | Career total | | | 8 | 0 | 2 | 0 | 0 | 0 | 0 | 0 | 10 | 0 |
