= 2014 Indian Super League =

1st season of the Indian Super League

Indian Super League
- Season: 2014
- Dates: 12 October – 20 December
- Champions: Atletico de Kolkata (1st title)
- Matches: 61
- Goals: 129 (2.11 per match)
- Top goalscorer: Elano (8 goals)
- Best goalkeeper: Jan Šeda (143.33 mins per goal)
- Biggest home win: Mumbai City 5–0 Pune City (18 October 2014)
- Biggest away win: Mumbai City 0–3 Chennaiyin (23 November 2014)
- Highest scoring: Chennaiyin 5–1 Mumbai City (28 October 2014)
- Longest winning run: Goa (4 games)
- Longest unbeaten run: Goa (10 games)
- Longest winless run: Delhi Dynamos; Mumbai City; NorthEast United (6 games)
- Longest losing run: Mumbai City (3 games)
- Highest attendance: 65,000; Atlético de Kolkata 3–0 Mumbai City (12 October 2014)
- Lowest attendance: 7,243; Pune City 1–1 Chennaiyin (11 November 2014)
- Total attendance: 1,590,292
- Average attendance: 24,357

The 2014 Hero Indian Super League was the first season of the Indian Super League, the top flight football league of India. The season featured eight teams, each playing 14 matches during the regular season.

The regular season started on 12 October when Atlético de Kolkata defeated Mumbai City 3–0 at the Salt Lake Stadium in Kolkata. The season ended on 20 December when Atlético de Kolkata defeated the Kerala Blasters in the final 1–0 in front of 36,484 spectators. Mohammed Rafique was the lone goalscorer as the Kolkata club became the inaugural champions.

== Teams ==
Locations of the ISL Teams

=== Stadiums and locations ===
| Team | City/State | Stadium | Capacity |
|---|---|---|---|
| Atlético de Kolkata | Kolkata, West Bengal | Salt Lake Stadium | 68,000 |
| Chennaiyin | Chennai, Tamil Nadu | Marina Arena | 19,484 |
| Delhi Dynamos | Delhi | Jawaharlal Nehru Stadium | 60,000 |
| Goa | Margao, Goa | Fatorda Stadium | 19,500 |
| Kerala Blasters | Kochi, Kerala | Jawaharlal Nehru Stadium | 60,000 |
| Mumbai City | Mumbai, Maharashtra | DY Patil Stadium | 55,000 |
| NorthEast United | Guwahati, Assam | Indira Gandhi Athletic Stadium | 35,000 |
| Pune City | Pune, Maharashtra | Balewadi Stadium | 12,000 |

=== Personnel and sponsorship ===
| Team | Head coach | Captain | Kit manufacture | Shirt sponsor |
|---|---|---|---|---|
| Atlético de Kolkata | (Spain) Antonio López Habas | (Spain) Luis García | Umbro | Aircel |
| Chennaiyin | (Italy) Marco Materazzi | (Sweden) Bojan Djordjic | TYKA | Ozone Group |
| Delhi Dynamos | (Netherlands) Harm van Veldhoven | (Netherlands) Hans Mulder | Lotto | FreeCharge |
| Goa | (Brazil) Zico | (France) Robert Pires | Adidas | Videocon d2h |
| Kerala Blasters | (England) David James | | Puma | Muthoot Group |
| Mumbai City | (England) Peter Reid | (India) Syed Rahim Nabi | Puma | Jabong.com |
| NorthEast United | (New Zealand) Ricki Herbert | (Portugal) Miguel Garcia | Adidas | HTC |
| Pune City | (Italy) Franco Colomba | (France) David Trezeguet | Dida | Various |

=== Marquee players ===
| Team | Marquee |
|---|---|
| Atlético de Kolkata | (Spain) Luis García |
| Chennaiyin | (Brazil) Elano |
| Delhi Dynamos | (Italy) Alessandro Del Piero |
| Goa | (France) Robert Pires |
| Kerala Blasters | (England) David James |
| Mumbai City | (Sweden) Freddie Ljungberg |
| NorthEast United | (Spain) Joan Capdevila |
| Pune City | (France) David Trezeguet |

=== Player drafts ===
Before the season began, the rosters were formed through two player drafts, based on the college draft system used in the United States. The first draft would be to sign the initial 14 Indian players and then the second one would be to sign seven foreign players.

==== Domestic players draft ====
The domestic players draft took place within two days on 22 July and 23 July 2014 in Mumbai. There were 84 players up for grabs during the draft that could be selected between six of the eight Indian Super League teams (Goa and NorthEast United selected from their respective I-League teams). Close to 50% of the 84 players had played for India internationally. The opening pick in the draft was Lenny Rodrigues by FC Pune City. Subrata Pal, Syed Nabi, and Gouramangi Singh were the most expensive picks during the draft.

==== International draft ====
After the completion of the domestic draft, the international draft took place on 21 August 2014, also in Mumbai. There were 49 players available for selection during the draft. The first pick in the draft was former Inter Milan defender, Bruno Cirillo, who was selected by FC Pune City.

== Regular season ==
=== League table ===
| Pos | Team | Pld | W | D | L | GF | GA | GD | Pts | Qualification |
|---|---|---|---|---|---|---|---|---|---|---|
| 1 | Chennaiyin | 14 | 6 | 5 | 3 | 24 | 20 | +4 | 23 | Advance to ISL Play-offs |
| 2 | Goa | 14 | 6 | 4 | 4 | 21 | 12 | +9 | 22 | Advance to ISL Play-offs |
| 3 | Atlético de Kolkata (C) | 14 | 4 | 7 | 3 | 16 | 13 | +3 | 19 | Advance to ISL Play-offs |
| 4 | Kerala Blasters | 14 | 5 | 4 | 5 | 9 | 11 | −2 | 19 | Advance to ISL Play-offs |
| 5 | Delhi Dynamos | 14 | 4 | 6 | 4 | 16 | 14 | +2 | 18 | |
| 6 | Pune City | 14 | 4 | 4 | 6 | 12 | 17 | −5 | 16 | |
| 7 | Mumbai City | 14 | 4 | 4 | 6 | 12 | 21 | −9 | 16 | |
| 8 | NorthEast United | 14 | 3 | 6 | 5 | 11 | 13 | −2 | 15 | |

Source: Soccerway
Rules for classification: 1) points; 2) goal difference; 3) number of goals scored
(C) Champions

=== Results ===
| Home \ Away | ATK | CFC | DD | FCG | KB | MUM | NEU | FCPC |
|---|---|---|---|---|---|---|---|---|
| Atlético de Kolkata | — | 0–1 | 1–1 | 1–1 | 1–1 | 3–0 | 1–0 | 1–3 |
| Chennaiyin | 1–1 | — | 2–2 | 1–3 | 2–1 | 5–1 | 2–2 | 3–1 |
| Delhi Dynamos | 0–0 | 4–1 | — | 1–4 | 0–1 | 4–1 | 0–0 | 0–0 |
| Goa | 1–2 | 1–2 | 2–1 | — | 3–0 | 0–0 | 3–0 | 2–0 |
| Kerala Blasters | 2–1 | 0–1 | 0–0 | 1–0 | — | 0–0 | 0–0 | 1–0 |
| Mumbai City | 2–1 | 0–3 | 1–0 | 0–0 | 1–0 | — | 0–2 | 5–0 |
| NorthEast United | 0–2 | 3–0 | 1–2 | 1–1 | 1–0 | 1–1 | — | 0–0 |
| Pune City | 1–1 | 1–1 | 0–1 | 2–0 | 1–2 | 2–0 | 1–0 | — |

Source: Indian Super League Fixtures
Legend: Blue = home team win; Yellow = draw; Red = away team win.

== Playoffs ==
=== Semi-finals ===
==== First leg ====
| 13 December | Kerala Blasters | 3–0 | Chennaiyin | Jawaharlal Nehru Stadium, Kochi |
| Saturday 19:00 IST | Ahmed 27'; Hume 29'; Methew 90+4' | titans-fc-to-boost-final-hopes Report | | Attendance: 60,900; Referee: Pranjal Banerjee |

| 14 December | Atlético de Kolkata | 0–0 | Goa | Salt Lake Stadium, Kolkata |
| Sunday 19:00 IST | | Report | | Attendance: 53,173; Referee: Santosh Kumar |

==== Second leg ====
| 16 December | Chennaiyin | 3–1 (a.e.t.) (3–4 agg.) | Kerala Blasters | Marina Arena Chennai |
| Tuesday 19:00 IST | Silvestre 42'; Jhingan (o.g.); Lalpekhlua 90' | Report | Pearson 117' | Attendance: 25,317; Referee: Tejas Nagvenkar |

| 17 December | Goa | 0–0 (a.e.t.) (0–0 agg.) (2–4 p) | Atlético de Kolkata | Fatorda Stadium, Margao, Goa |
| Wednesday 19:00 IST | | Report | | Attendance: 19,012; Referee: Ravshan Irmatov |
| | Penalties |
| | Santos (penalty missed); Ozbey (penalty scored); Amiri (penalty missed); Miranda (penalty scored) | | (penalty scored) Josemi; (penalty scored) Rafi; (penalty scored) Jofre; (penalty scored) Borja |

=== Final ===
| 20 December | Kerala Blasters | 0–1 | Atlético de Kolkata | DY Patil Stadium, Mumbai |
| Saturday 18:00 IST | | Report | Rafique 90+5' | Attendance: 36,484; Referee: Ravshan Irmatov |

== Attendance ==
=== Average home attendances ===
Note: Table lists in order of average attendance.

| Pos | Team | Total | High | Low | Average | Change |
|---|---|---|---|---|---|---|
| 1 | Kerala Blasters | 392,886 | 61,323 | 34,657 | 49,111 | n/a |
| 2 | Atlético de Kolkata | 316,195 | 65,000 | 21,550 | 45,171 | n/a |
| 3 | NorthEast United | 200,296 | 31,770 | 25,530 | 28,614 | n/a |
| 4 | Mumbai City | 158,142 | 28,000 | 18,197 | 22,592 | n/a |
| 5 | Chennaiyin | 176,757 | 25,317 | 16,567 | 22,095 | n/a |
| 6 | Goa | 144,524 | 19,752 | 16,652 | 18,066 | n/a |
| 7 | Delhi Dynamos | 109,993 | 18,268 | 13,000 | 15,713 | n/a |
| 8 | Pune City | 55,015 | 8,427 | 7,243 | 7,859 | n/a |
| | League total | 1,590,292 | 65,000 | 7,243 | 26,505 | n/a |

Updated to games played on 20 December 2014
Source: Official club websites and Indian Super League

=== Highest attendances ===
| Rank | Home team | Score | Away team | Attendance | Date | Stadium |
|---|---|---|---|---|---|---|
| 1 | Atlético de Kolkata | 3–0 | Mumbai City | 65,000 | 12 October 2014 | Salt Lake Stadium |
| 2 | Kerala Blasters | 0–1 | Chennaiyin | 61,323 | 30 November 2014 | Jawaharlal Nehru Stadium |
| 3 | Kerala Blasters | 3–0 | Chennaiyin | 60,900 | 13 December 2014 | Jawaharlal Nehru Stadium |
| 4 | Kerala Blasters | 2–1 | Atlético de Kolkata | 57,296 | 21 November 2014 | Jawaharlal Nehru Stadium |
| 5 | Atlético de Kolkata | 1–1 | Delhi Dynamos | 55,793 | 19 October 2014 | Salt Lake Stadium |
| 6 | Atlético de Kolkata | 0–0 | Goa | 53,173 | 14 December 2014 | Salt Lake Stadium |
| 7 | Kerala Blasters | 1–0 | Goa | 49,517 | 6 November 2014 | Jawaharlal Nehru Stadium |
| 8 | Atlético de Kolkata | 0–0 | Chennaiyin | 46,288 | 14 November 2014 | Salt Lake Stadium |
| 9 | Kerala Blasters | 1–0 | Pune City | 44,532 | 9 December 2014 | Jawaharlal Nehru Stadium |
| 10 | Kerala Blasters | 0–0 | NorthEast United | 43,299 | 4 December 2014 | Jawaharlal Nehru Stadium |

== Statistics ==
=== Scoring ===
==== Top scorers ====
| Rank | Player | Club | Goals |
|---|---|---|---|
| 1 | (Brazil) Elano | Chennaiyin | 8 |
| 2 | (Ethiopia) Fikru Teferra | Atlético de Kolkata | 5 |
| 2 | (Brazil) Gustavo Marmentini | Delhi Dynamos | 5 |
| 2 | (Czech Republic) Miroslav Slepička | Goa | 5 |
| 2 | (Canada) Iain Hume | Kerala Blasters | 5 |
| 6 | (Brazil) Bruno Pelissari | Chennaiyin | 4 |
| 6 | (India) Jeje Lalpekhlua | Chennaiyin | 4 |
| 6 | (Colombia) Stiven Mendoza | Chennaiyin | 4 |
| 6 | (Brazil) André Santos | Goa | 4 |
| 6 | (Spain) Koke | NorthEast United | 4 |
| 6 | (Greece) Kostas Katsouranis | Pune City | 4 |

==== Top Indian scorers ====
| Rank | Player | Club | Goals |
|---|---|---|---|
| 1 | (India) Jeje Lalpekhlua | Chennaiyin | 4 |
| 2 | (India) Romeo Fernandes | Goa | 3 |
| 3 | (India) Baljit Sahni | Atlético de Kolkata | 2 |
| 3 | (India) Cavin Lobo | Atlético de Kolkata | 2 |

==== Hat-tricks ====
| Player | For | Against | Result | Date |
|---|---|---|---|---|
| (Brazil) André Moritz | Mumbai City | Pune City | 5–0 | 18 October 2014 |

=== Assists ===
| Rank | Player | Club | Assists | Ref |
|---|---|---|---|---|
| 1 | ? | ? | ? | |

=== Clean sheets ===
| Rank | Player | Club | Clean sheets |
|---|---|---|---|
| 1 | (Czech Republic) Jan Šeda | Goa | 7 |
| 2 | (India) Subrata Pal | Mumbai City | 6 |
| 3 | (Belgium) Kristof Van Hout | Delhi Dynamos | 5 |
| 3 | (England) David James | Kerala Blasters | 5 |
| 3 | (India) Rehenesh TP | NorthEast United | 5 |

=== Hero of the Match ===
| Match | Hero of the Match | | Match | Hero of the Match | | Match | Hero of the Match | |
| Match | Player | Club | Match | Player | Club | Match | Player | Club |
|---|---|---|---|---|---|---|---|---|
| Match 1 | (Spain) Borja Fernández | Atlético de Kolkata | Match 21 | (Spain) Luis García | Atlético de Kolkata | Match 41 | (Brazil) André Santos | Goa |
| Match 2 | (Greece) Alexandros Tzorvas | NorthEast United | Match 22 | (France) Nicolas Anelka | Mumbai City | Match 42 | (Senegal) Massamba Sambou | NorthEast United |
| Match 3 | (Italy) Alessandro Del Piero | Delhi Dynamos | Match 23 | (India) Milagres Gonsalves | Kerala Blasters | Match 43 | (Brazil) Gustavo Marmentini | Delhi Dynamos |
| Match 4 | (India) Balwant Singh | Chennaiyin | Match 24 | (Nigeria) Dudu Omagbemi | Pune City | Match 44 | (Greece) Kostas Katsouranis | Pune City |
| Match 5 | (Ethiopia) Fikru Teferra | Atlético de Kolkata | Match 25 | (Brazil) Elano | Chennaiyin | Match 45 | (France) Bernard Mendy | Chennaiyin |
| Match 6 | (Brazil) André Moritz | Mumbai City | Match 26 | (Czech Republic) Jan Štohanzl | Mumbai City | Match 46 | (India) Romeo Fernandes | Goa |
| Match 7 | (Czech Republic) Pavel Eliáš | Delhi Dynamos | Match 27 | (Scotland) Stephen Pearson | Kerala Blasters | Match 47 | (Brazil) Gustavo Marmentini | Delhi Dynamos |
| Match 8 | (France) Grégory Arnolin | Goa | Match 28 | (Colombia) Stiven Mendoza | Chennaiyin | Match 48 | (Nigeria) Dudu Omagbemi | Pune City |
| Match 9 | (France) Bernard Mendy | Chennaiyin | Match 29 | (India) Chinadorai Sabeeth | Kerala Blasters | Match 49 | (India) Sandip Nandy | Kerala Blasters |
| Match 10 | (India) Cavin Lobo | Atlético de Kolkata | Match 30 | (France) Youness Bengelloun | Goa | Match 50 | (India) Romeo Fernandes | Goa |
| Match 11 | (Zambia) Kondwani Mtonga | NorthEast United | Match 31 | (Spain) Jofre | Atlético de Kolkata | Match 51 | (Brazil) Gustavo Marmentini | Delhi Dynamos |
| Match 12 | (Belgium) Wim Raymaekers | Delhi Dynamos | Match 32 | (Greece) Kostas Katsouranis | Pune City | Match 52 | (India) Lalrindika Ralte | Mumbai City |
| Match 13 | (Canada) Iain Hume | Kerala Blasters | Match 33 | (Canada) Iain Hume | Kerala Blasters | Match 53 | (India) Jeje Lalpekhlua | Chennaiyin |
| Match 14 | (Greece) Kostas Katsouranis | Pune City | Match 34 | (Brazil) André Moritz | Mumbai City | Match 54 | (Canada) Iain Hume | Kerala Blasters |
| Match 15 | (Brazil) Elano | Chennaiyin | Match 35 | (Spain) Luis García | Atlético de Kolkata | Match 55 | (Ethiopia) Fikru Teferra | Atlético de Kolkata |
| Match 16 | (Netherlands) Hans Mulder | Delhi Dynamos | Match 36 | (Colombia) Stiven Mendoza | Banglore titans | Match 56 | (Spain) Koke | NorthEast United |
| Match 17 | (Canada) Iain Hume | Kerala Blasters | Match 37 | (Brazil) Pedro Gusmão | Kerala Blasters | Match 57 | (India) Ishfaq Ahmed | Kerala Blasters |
| Match 18 | (India) Jewel Raja | Goa | Match 38 | (India) Romeo Fernandes | Goa | Match 58 | (France) Grégory Arnolin | Goa |
| Match 19 | (France) Nicolas Anelka | Mumbai City | Match 39 | (Brazil) Bruno Pelissari | Chennaiyin | Match 59 | (Republic of Ireland) Colin Falvey | Kerala Blasters |
| Match 20 | (India) Rehenesh TP | NorthEast United | Match 40 | (Brazil) Gustavo Marmentini | Delhi Dynamos | Match 60 | (Brazil) André Santos | Goa |
| | | | | | | Match 61 | (India) Mohammed Rafique | Atlético de Kolkata |

== End-of-season awards ==
| Award | Player/Club |
|---|---|
| Golden Ball for Hero of the League | (Canada) Iain Hume (Kerala Blasters) |
| Golden Boot | (Brazil) Elano (Chennaiyin) |
| Most Exciting Player | (Spain) Luis García (Athlético de Kolkata) |
| Fittest player | (Czech Republic) Jan Štohanzl (Mumbai City) |
| Indian Super League Golden Glove | (Czech Republic) Jan Šeda (Goa) |
| Emerging Player of the Season | (India) Sandesh Jhingan (Kerala Blasters) |
| Goal of the Season | (Greece) Kostas Katsouranis (Pune City) |
| Happy Fans Award for Best Club at Home | Kerala Blasters |
| Happy Fans Runners Award for Second Best Club at Home | Northeast United |
| Fair Play Award | Delhi Dynamos |

== See also ==
- 2014 Atlético de Kolkata season
- 2014 Chennaiyin FC season
- 2014 Delhi Dynamos FC season
- 2014 FC Goa season
- 2014 Kerala Blasters FC season
- 2014 Mumbai City FC season
- 2014 NorthEast United FC season
- 2014 FC Pune City season
