= Borja Fernández (footballer, born 1981) =

Spanish footballer

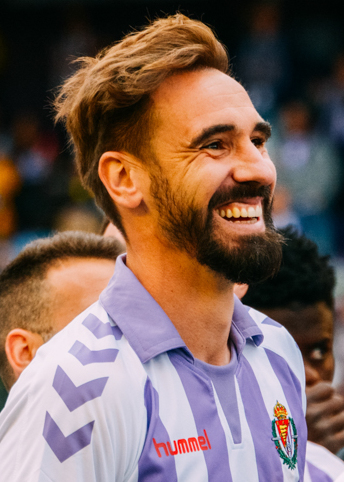
- Borja with Valladolid in 2019

Personal information
- Full name: Borja Fernández Fernández
- Date of birth: 14 January 1981 (age 45)
- Place of birth: Ourense, Spain
- Height: 1.89 m (6 ft 2 1/2 in)
- Position: Defensive midfielder

Team information
- Current team: Lugo (manager)

Youth career
- Pabellón
- 1996–2000: Real Madrid

Senior career*
Years	Team	Apps	(Gls)
2000–2001	Real Madrid C		
2001–2003	Real Madrid B	67	(2)
2003–2006	Real Madrid	23	(0)
2005–2006	→ Mallorca (loan)	16	(0)
2006–2010	Valladolid	128	(3)
2010–2014	Getafe	57	(1)
2011–2012	→ Deportivo La Coruña (loan)	22	(2)
2014	Atlético Kolkata	16	(1)
2015	Eibar	16	(1)
2015	Atlético Kolkata	15	(1)
2016	Valladolid	17	(0)
2016	Atlético Kolkata	16	(0)
2017	Almería	20	(2)
2017–2019	Valladolid	56	(3)
Total		469	(16)

International career
1997–1998	Spain U16	15	(0)
1998–1999	Spain U17	9	(0)
1999–2000	Spain U18	4	(0)
2002–2003	Spain U21	2	(0)

Managerial career
- 2020–2021: Valladolid B (assistant)
- 2021–2022: Valladolid (youth)
- 2024–2026: Ourense
- 2026–: Lugo
- * Club domestic league appearances and goals

Borja Fernández Fernández (born 14 January 1981) is a Spanish former professional footballer who played as a defensive midfielder. He is the manager of Primera Federación club Lugo.

Having started his career at Real Madrid, he amassed La Liga totals of 222 matches and three goals over 11 seasons. He also represented in the competition Mallorca, Valladolid, Getafe and Eibar.

Fernández signed for ATK in 2014, winning the first Indian Super League.

== Playing career ==
=== Spain ===
Born in Ourense, Galicia, Fernández joined Real Madrid's academy in 1996 and, after impressive displays for the C and B teams, was promoted to the main squad in 2003. He appeared in 15 La Liga games that season – with his debut coming on 2 September 2003 in a 1–1 away draw against Villarreal CF– and eight in his second year (mostly as a late substitute).

Unable to break into the first team, Fernández was loaned to RCD Mallorca for the 2005–06 campaign, where he also played sparingly. He subsequently joined Segunda División club Real Valladolid, being instrumental in the side's top-flight promotion after a three-year hiatus and continuing to start regularly in the subsequent seasons under manager José Luis Mendilibar.

Fernández was again a defensive pillar for Valladolid in 2009–10, featuring in 31 matches as the Castile and León side was eventually relegated, as 19th. In late May 2010, he signed a four-year contract with Getafe CF.

In August 2011, Fernández returned to the second division and joined Deportivo de La Coruña, with Rubén Pérez heading in the opposite direction. He subsequently returned to Geta, scoring his first official goal for the team on 16 March 2013, the game's only at home against Athletic Bilbao.

=== India and Eibar ===
On 4 July 2014, at the age of 33, Fernández moved abroad for the first time, becoming the first signing for ATK of the Indian Super League and the very first signing in the league ever. He scored the second goal in the league's opening match, a 3–0 home victory over Mumbai City FC. In the next fixture he was sent off for two yellow cards in the 84th minute, but his team still won 2–0 at NorthEast United FC.

Fernández played a pivotal role for Atlético as they went on to win the championship, defeating Kerala Blasters FC in the final through a last-minute goal by Mohammed Rafique. On 31 December 2014 he returned to Spain, after agreeing to a six-month contract with top-tier club SD Eibar. His debut came on 16 January of the following year, replacing Javi Lara in added time of a 1–1 draw at Córdoba CF. He started in 14 of his appearances to help the Basques retain their status, scoring an equaliser in a 1–1 away draw against Getafe on 17 May.

On 17 June 2015, Fernández returned to ATK, succeeding his compatriot Luis García as the franchise's captain for their second campaign. He scored once in 15 matches – in a 4–0 home rout of FC Goa on 22 November– as his team were eliminated in the semi-finals by Chennaiyin FC.

=== Valladolid return and later career ===
Fernández returned to Valladolid on 25 January 2016, linking until the end of the second-division season. On 12 August, he rejoined Kolkata for the third ISL campaign.

On 17 January 2017, Fernández returned to Spain and its second tier after agreeing to a six-month deal with UD Almería. On 12 July, he returned to Valladolid for a third spell after signing a one-year contract.

After contributing sparingly as the latter side retained their top-flight status, the 38-year-old Borja announced his retirement in May 2019. He remained connected to his last club in other capacities.

== Coaching career ==
After retiring, Fernández worked as assistant manager to Javier Baraja at Valladolid B, later being in charge of the club's youths. On 3 April 2024, he was appointed head coach of Tercera Federación team UD Ourense, overseeing consecutive promotions in his first two full seasons but leaving in June 2026.

On 16 June 2026, Fernández was appointed at CD Lugo in the Primera Federación.

== Career statistics ==
Club	Season	League			Cup		Continental		Total	
Club	Season	Division	Apps	Goals	Apps	Goals	Apps	Goals	Apps	Goals
Real Madrid	2001–02	La Liga	0	0	3	0	—		3	0
Real Madrid	2002–03	La Liga	0	0	1	0	—		1	0
Real Madrid	2003–04	La Liga	15	0	5	0	4 (Note: Appearances in UEFA Champions League)	0	24	0
Real Madrid	2004–05	La Liga	8	0	2	0	0	0	10	0
Real Madrid	Total		23	0	11	0	4	0	38	0
Mallorca	2005–06	La Liga	16	0	1	0	—		17	0
Valladolid	2006–07	Segunda División	37	2	5	0	—		42	2
Valladolid	2007–08	La Liga	31	1	4	0	—		35	1
Valladolid	2008–09	La Liga	29	0	2	0	—		31	0
Valladolid	2009–10	La Liga	31	0	1	0	—		32	0
Valladolid	Total		128	3	13	0	—		140	3
Getafe	2010–11	La Liga	13	0	1	0	6 (Note: Appearances in UEFA Europa League)	0	20	0
Getafe	2012–13	La Liga	16	1	1	0	—		17	1
Getafe	2013–14	La Liga	28	0	1	0	—		29	0
Getafe	Total		57	1	3	0	6	0	66	1
Deportivo	2011–12	Segunda División	22	2	2	0	—		24	2
ATK	2014	Indian Super League	16	1	—				16	1
Eibar	2014–15	La Liga	16	1	0	0	—		16	1
ATK	2015	Indian Super League	15	1	—				15	1
Valladolid	2015–16	Segunda División	17	0	0	0	—		17	0
ATK	2016	Indian Super League	16	0	—				16	0
Almería	2016–17	Segunda División	20	2	0	0	—		20	2
Valladolid	2017–18	Segunda División	37	3	0	0	4 (Note: Appearances in La Liga play-offs)	0	41	3
Valladolid	2018–19	La Liga	19	0	3	0	—		22	0
Valladolid	Total		56	3	3	0	4	0	63	1
Career total			402	14	32	0	14	0	448	14

== Managerial statistics ==
As of 6 November 2026

Managerial record by team and tenure
Team	Nat	From	To	Record								Ref
Team	Nat	From	To	G	W	D	L	GF	GA	GD	Win %	Ref
Ourense	(Spain)	3 April 2024	8 June 2026	84	44	27	13	122	69	+53	52.38	
Lugo	(Spain)	16 June 2026	Present	11	9	1	1	19	9	+10	81.82	
Total				95	53	28	14	141	78	+63	55.79	—

== Honours ==
Valladolid

- Segunda División: 2006–07

Deportivo

- Segunda División: 2011–12

ATK

- Indian Super League: 2014, 2016
