= Mohammed Rafique (footballer) =

Indian footballer (born 1991)

Personal information
- Date of birth: 26 March 1991 (age 35)
- Place of birth: Sodepur, West Bengal, India
- Height: 1.73 m (5 ft 8 in)
- Positions: Midfielder; right back

Team information
- Current team: Sundarban Bengal Auto
- Number: 8

Youth career
- Tollygunge Agragami

Senior career*
Years	Team	Apps	(Gls)
2010–2014	United SC	49	(4)
2014–2018	East Bengal	42	(2)
2014–2015	→ ATK (loan)	7	(1)
2016	→ Kerala Blasters (loan)	10	(0)
2018–2020	Mumbai City	17	(0)
2020–2022	East Bengal	31	(0)
2022–2024	Chennaiyin	3	(0)
2024	Diamond Harbour	10	(0)
2025	United SC	14	(0)
2025–	Sundarban Bengal Auto	4	(0)

International career^{‡}
2016–2018	India	12	(1)
- * Club domestic league appearances and goals as of 08:41, 12 January 2026 (UTC) ‡ National team caps and goals as of 7 June 2018

Mohammed Rafique (born 26 March 1991) is an Indian professional footballer who plays as a midfielder for Sundarban Bengal Auto in the Bengal Super League.

== Club career ==
=== Prayag United ===
After spending his youth years at Tollygunge Agragami, Rafique joined Prayag United in 2010 and would go on to play 6 senior games in his debut season, scoring once against Chirag United Kerala. Rafique played five games during the 2011-12 I-League season, his second at senior level for Prayag. Rafique established himself as a regular in the centre of midfield in his final two seasons at United SC.

=== East Bengal ===
Rafique signed for East Bengal in May 2014 on a two-year deal and was loaned out to Atlético de Kolkata for the 2014 Indian Super League. Rafique scored the title winning goal in the 90th minute from a corner in the final.

Rafique returned to parent club East Bengal for the 2014–15 I-League season, making his debut for the team in the 2014–15 Federation Cup.

== International career ==
Rafique made his debut for the India national football team against Laos on 2 June 2016 at the Asian Cup Qualifiers. He scored his first national team goal against Laos on 7 June 2016 in the 85th minute of the match.

== Career statistics ==
=== Club ===
As of 24 December 2022

Club	Season	League			Cup		Others		AFC		Total	
Club	Season	Division	Apps	Goals	Apps	Goals	Apps	Goals	Apps	Goals	Apps	Goals
United Sports Club	2010–11	I-League	6	1	0	0	? (Note: Appearance(s) in Calcutta Football League)	3	–		6	1
United Sports Club	2011–12	I-League	5	0	4 (Note: Appearance(s) in Federation Cup)	0	?	1	–		9	0
United Sports Club	2012–13	I-League	20	3	3	2	?	3	–		23	5
United Sports Club	2013–14	I-League	18	0	0	0	–		–		18	0
United Sports Club	United SC total		49	4	7	2	?	7	0	0	56	13
East Bengal	2014–15	I-League	11	0	3	0	3	0	6 (Note: Appearance(s) in AFC Cup)	0	23	0
East Bengal	2015–16	I-League	12	1	2	0	14 (Note: Appearance(s) in Sheikh Kamal International Club Cup)	7	–		28	8
East Bengal	2016–17	I-League	5	0	3	0	7	1	–		15	1
East Bengal	2017–18	I-League	14	1	0	0	5	0	–		19	1
East Bengal	East Bengal total		42	2	8	0	29	8	6	0	85	10
ATK (loan)	2014	Indian Super League	2	1	0	0	–		–		2	1
ATK (loan)	2015	Indian Super League	5	0	0	0	–		–		5	0
ATK (loan)	ATK total		7	1	0	0	0	0	0	0	7	1
Kerala Blasters (loan)	2016	Indian Super League	10	0	0	0	–		–		10	0
Mumbai City	2018–19	Indian Super League	11	0	0	0	–		–		11	0
Mumbai City	2019–20	Indian Super League	6	0	0	0	–		–		6	0
Mumbai City	Mumbai City total		17	0	0	0	0	0	0	0	17	0
East Bengal	2020–21	Indian Super League	15	0	0	0	–		–		15	0
East Bengal	2021–22	Indian Super League	16	0	0	0	–		–		16	0
East Bengal	East Bengal total		31	0	0	0	0	0	0	0	31	0
Chennaiyin	2022–23	Indian Super League	3	0	0	0	–		–		3	0
Career total			159	7	15	2	29	8	6	0	209	17

=== International ===
As of matches played till 7 June 2018

National team	Year	Apps	Goals
India	2016	3	1
India	2017	6	0
India	2018	3	0
Total		12	1

==== International goals ====
Scores and results list India's goal tally first

No.	Date	Venue	Cap	Opponent	Score	Result	Competition	Ref.
1.	7 June 2016	Indira Gandhi Athletic Stadium, Guwahati, India	3	Laos	5–1	6–1	2019 AFC Asian Cup qualification	

== Honours ==
Prayag United

- Durand Cup: 2010
- IFA Shield: 2013

East Bengal

- Calcutta Football League: 2014, 2015, 2016, 2017

Atlético de Kolkata

- Indian Super League: 2014

India

- Tri-Nation Series: 2017
- Intercontinental Cup: 2018
