= Cavin Lobo =

Indian footballer

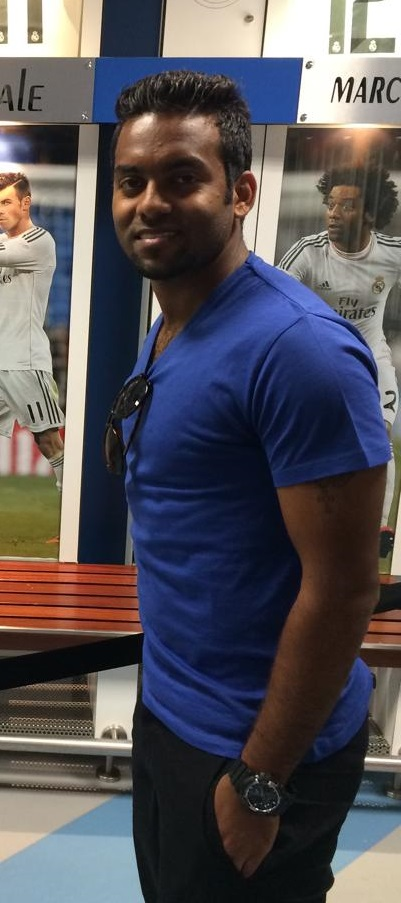
- Cavin at Santiago Bernabéu in 2014

Personal information
- Full name: Cavin Peter Lobo
- Date of birth: 4 April 1988 (age 38)
- Place of birth: Goa, India
- Height: 1.75 m (5 ft 9 in)
- Position: Attacking midfielder

Team information
- Current team: Vasco
- Number: 15

Youth career
- Sporting Goa

Senior career*
Years	Team	Apps	(Gls)
?	Sporting Goa		
2010	Dempo		
2011–2012	Mumbai	12	(2)
2012–2018	East Bengal	110	(9)
2014	→ Atlético Kolkata (loan)	6	(2)
2015	→ Kerala Blasters (loan)	6	(1)
2018–2019	Atlético Kolkata	1	(0)
2018–2019	→ Churchill Brothers (loan)	4	(0)
2019–2020	Punjab	15	(0)
2020–2021	East Bengal	0	(0)
2021–	Vasco	89	(13)

International career^{‡}
2015–2019	India	15	(0)
- * Club domestic league appearances and goals as of 16:40, 10 April 2020 (UTC) ‡ National team caps and goals as of 11:10, 13 November 2015 (UTC)

Cavin Lobo (born 4 April 1988) is an Indian professional footballer who plays as an attacking midfielder for Indian Goa Professional League club Vasco.

== Career ==
=== Early career ===
In 2010 Lobo was playing for Sporting Goa who were then in the I-League 2nd Division and the Goa football team in the Santosh Trophy. After a good performance for Goa in the Santosh Trophy, Lobo was signed by then reigning I-League champions Dempo for the 2010-11 season. Then in 2011, Lobo signed for another I-League side Mumbai. The midfielder scored twice in the campaign with his new club. He scored his first goal for the club on 22 December 2011 against HAL, in the 77th minute as Mumbai won 4–0. He then scored his second goal for Mumbai on 6 February 2012 in the 36th minute to help Mumbai to a surprise 2–1 victory.

=== East Bengal ===
For the 2012-13 season, Lobo signed for East Bengal. Lobo made his debut for East Bengal in the I-League on 30 December 2012 against Pailan Arrows, coming on as an 87th-minute substitute for Penn Orji in a match that East Bengal won 3–0. On 8 May 2013, he scored his 1st goal of the season in a 6–0 win during a 2012-13 season match over United Sikkim.

==== Atlético de Kolkata (loan) ====
In the 2014 Indian Super League, Lobo was picked in the first round of domestic draft by Atletico de Kolkata. On 23 October 2014, he scored twice in the second half to inspire a 2–1 comeback against FC Goa in a home match and became the first Indian player to score 2 goals in a single ISL match.

==== Kerala Blasters (loan) ====
In July 2015 Lobo was drafted to play for Kerala Blasters FC in the 2015 Indian Super League.

=== ATK ===
Lobo returned to ATK for the fifth season of ISL

== International ==
Cavin Lobo made his debut for India on 12 March 2015 against Nepal, coming on as a substitute for Lenny Rodrigues and had an impressive outing, which included winning a penalty. Cavin Lobo also has been called up as probable for the World Cup Qualifiers against Oman and Guam .

== Career statistics ==
=== Club ===
Statistics as of 10 April 2020

Club	Season	League		Federation Cup		CFL Premier A		AFC		Total	
Club	Season	Apps	Goals	Apps	Goals	Apps	Goals	Apps	Goals	Apps	Goals
Sporting Clube Goa	?-2010										
Dempo	2010-11										
Mumbai FC	2011-12	2	2							2	2
East Bengal	2012–13	9	1	0	0	14	2	5	0	27	3
East Bengal	2013–14	23	2	2	0	7	2	—	—	32	4
East Bengal	2014–15	14	1	4	0	5	0	6	1	29	2
East Bengal	2015–16	9	0	0	0	5	0	0	0	13	0
East Bengal	2016–17	2	0	2	0	2	0	—	—	4	0
East Bengal	2017–18	13	1	4	0	7	0	—	—	24	1
East Bengal	Total	70	5	12	0	40	4	11	1	133	10
Atletico de Kolkata (loan)	2014	6	2	—	—	—	—	—	—	6	2
Kerala Blasters (loan)	2015	4	1	—	—	—	—	—	—	4	1
ATK	2018–19	1	-	-	0	-	-	—	—	3	0
Churchill Brothers S.C. (loan)	2019	4	0	—	—	—	—	—	—	4	0
Punjab F.C.	2019–20	15	0	—	—	—	—	—	—	15	0
Career total		102	10	12	0	40	4	11	1	167	15
