= Baljit Sahni =

Indian footballer

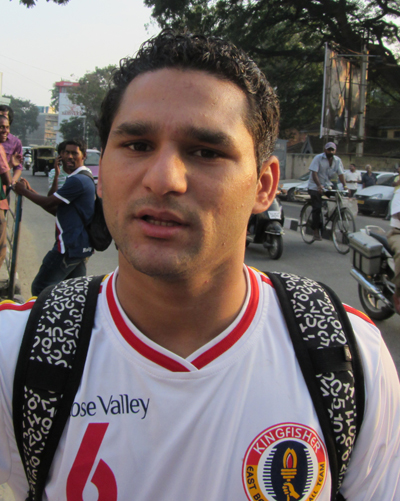

Personal information
- Full name: Baljit Singh Sahni
- Date of birth: 12 January 1987 (age 39)
- Place of birth: Hoshiarpur, Punjab, India
- Height: 1.75 m (5 ft 9 in)
- Position: Forward

Youth career
- JCT

Senior career*
Years	Team	Apps	(Gls)
2008–2010	JCT	40	(14)
2010–2015	East Bengal	31	(10)
2014	→ Atlético de Kolkata (loan)	16	(2)
2015	→ Atlético de Kolkata (loan)	5	(0)
2016	DSK Shivajians	12	(1)
2016	Chennaiyin	8	(0)
2017	Mumbai	4	(0)
2017–2018	FC Pune City	11	(0)

International career^{‡}
2010	India	3	(0)
- * Club domestic league appearances and goals as of 29 December 2016 ‡ National team caps and goals as of 29 December 2016

Baljit Sahni (born 12 January 1987) is an Indian former professional footballer who played as a forward.

== Career ==
=== JCT ===
Sahni had played for JCT for 5 years. In the 2009–10 season he scored the first hat trick of the season against Shillong Lajong. On 11 November 2009 however Sahni was seriously injured in a bike accident along with teammate Sunil Kumar Thakur in Margao, Goa while the team were preparing for an upcoming match against Salgaocar in the I-League. As a result of the accident Sahni required 25 stitches and he fractured his shin. At this point in the season Sahni was in top form with six goals in the opening seven matches. However, on 28 January 2010 Sahni played in his first game since the accident, coming on as a second-half substitute and he even scored a goal as JCT Mills defeated Sporting Goa 2–0.

=== East Bengal ===
In 2010 Sahni signed with I-League giants East Bengal.

== Retirement and financial struggle ==
Sahni faced monetary issues while playing, so he decided to retire early at the age of 31. Sahni said, "In 2019 I left for Canada. I was not getting paid enough. I had to earn my bread and butter and I also have a family to take care of. I retired from football because after football there is a life too and that is hard but you have to accept that life and take it on the chin."

== Career statistics ==
As of 14 April 2015

Club	Season	League			Federation Cup		Durand Cup		AFC		Total	
Club	Season	Division	Apps	Goals	Apps	Goals	Apps	Goals	Apps	Goals	Apps	Goals
JCT	2007–08	I-League	15	3	0	0	0	0	—	—	15	3
JCT	2008–09	I-League	12	3	2	1	4	1	—	—	18	5
JCT	2009–10	I-League	13	8	0	0	1	1	—	—	14	9
East Bengal	2010–11	I-League	6	6	0	0	0	0	6	3	12	9
East Bengal	2011–12	I-League	5	2	0	0	0	0	5	0	10	2
East Bengal	2012–13	I-League	6	0	0	0	0	0	7	0	13	0
East Bengal	2013–14	I-League	9	2	0	0	0	0	—	—	9	2
Atletico de Kolkata (loan)	2014	ISL	16	2	—	—	—	—	—	—	16	2
East Bengal	2014–15	I-League	5	0	0	0	0	0	3	0	8	0
Career total			87	24	2	1	5	2	21	3	115	20

== Honours ==
Atlético de Kolkata

- Indian Super League: 2014
