= Dudu Omagbemi =

Nigerian footballer

Macpherlin Omagbemi
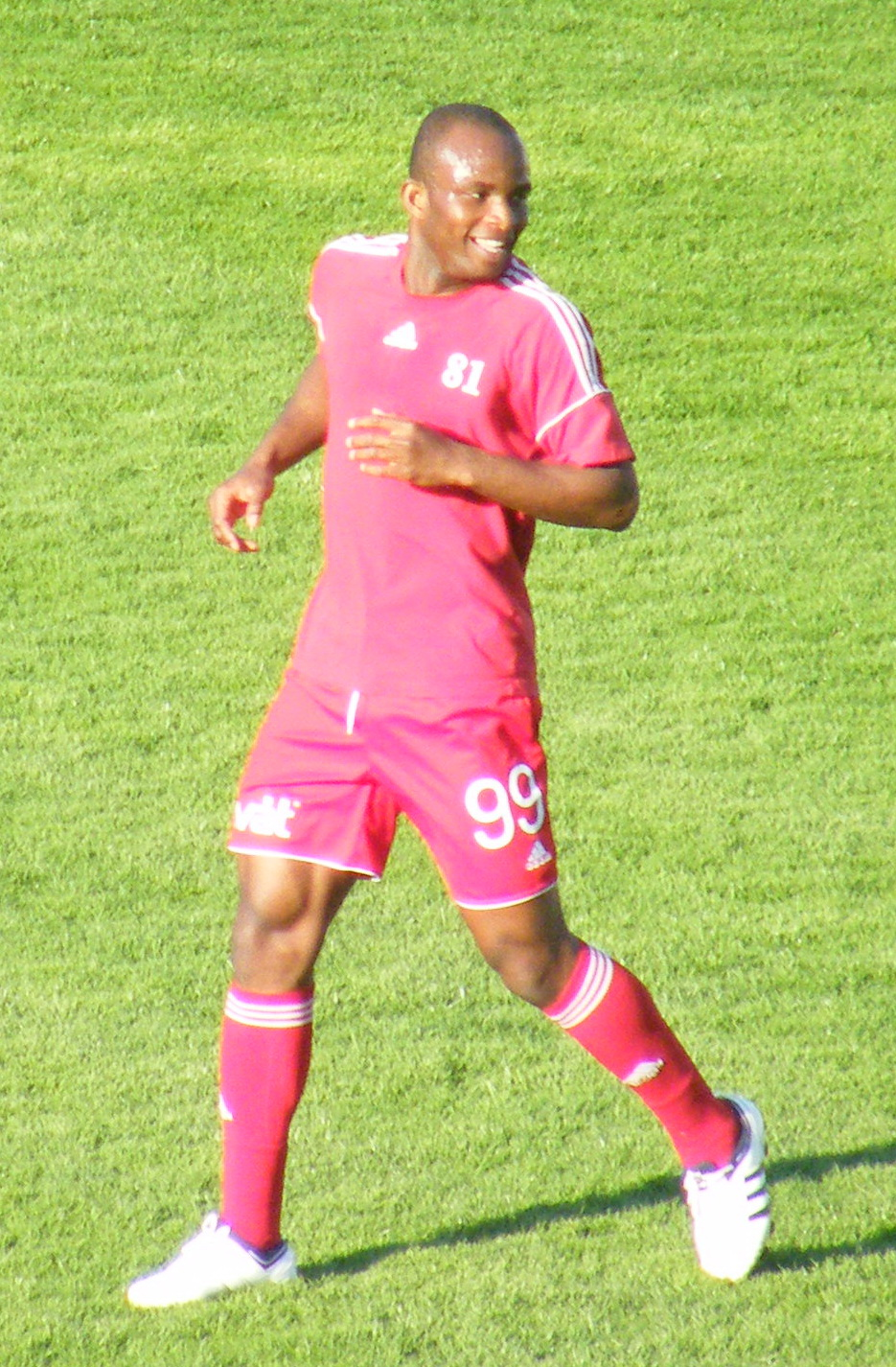

Personal information
- Full name: Macpherlin Dudu Omagbemi
- Date of birth: 18 July 1985 (age 41)
- Place of birth: Lagos, Nigeria
- Height: 1.79 m (5 ft 10 1/2 in)
- Position: Striker

Team information
- Current team: SexyPöxyt
- Number: 10

Youth career
- 1990–2001: Okobaba FC

Senior career*
Years	Team	Apps	(Gls)
2001–2007	Sporting Goa	186	(100)
2002	→ Dembo (loan)	7	(8)
2002	→ Salgaocar (loan)	5	(5)
2005	→ Penang FA (loan)	8	(4)
2007–2008	Wisła Kraków	9	(1)
2008–2009	Debrecen	16	(4)
2010	Kecskemét	5	(0)
2010	KuPS	10	(8)
2011–2012	Honka	41	(10)
2012–2013	KuPS	39	(6)
2013–2014	Salgaocar	10	(5)
2014–2015	East Bengal	18	(9)
2014	→ Pune City (loan)	12	(3)
2015	Mohun Bagan	7	(6)
2015	→ Goa (loan)	5	(3)
2016	Haka	13	(6)
2016–2017	Chennaiyin FC	13	(5)
2018	East Bengal	8	(8)
2020	Oskarshamns AIK	3	(1)
2020	MP	10	(2)
2023–	SexyPöxyt	27	(11)
- * Club domestic league appearances and goals as of 04:46, 18 January 2025 (UTC)

MacPherlin Dudu Omagbemi (born 18 July 1987), commonly known as Dudu, is a Nigerian professional footballer who plays as a striker for Finnish club SexyPöxyt.

== Career ==
Dudu started his career in India in 2001. He is the most tenacious player India has ever seen. At the Indian Football League, he had much success with Sporting Clube de Goa, including becoming the league's top goalscorer. During his time in India, he signed simultaneously contracts with two different clubs, SC Goa and Mahindra United. The issue was later settled between the two clubs. He also had a few other disputes with SC Goa later, concerning similar issues.

The charismatic football player rejected the 2008 Olympic call-up to put his career back on track and on 5 August 2008 he joined the 3 time Hungarian champion Debreceni VSC.

In August 2010 Dudu signed a contract with Finnish Division Two club FC OPA from where he was loaned out to Finnish Premier League side KuPS. In October 2010 Dudu signed a contract for the 2011 season with another Veikkausliiga team FC Honka. On 4 August 2012, he signed a contract until autumn 2013 with KuPS. On 4 August 2014, Dudu signed for I-League side Kingfisher East Bengal for a one-year deal.

On 1 September 2016, he joined Chennaiyin FC. On 26 November, he scored a brilliant hat-trick against North East United FC.

On 6 January 2018, Dudu joined East Bengal of I-League. He made his first appearance of the season in the Kolkata Derby on 21 January 2018 which East Bengal lost by a 0–2 margin. He found the net near the end of the added-time to help East Bengal beat Indian Arrows by a solitary goal, which was the first goal from the Nigerian striker, who returned to East Bengal after three seasons as a midseason replacement for injured Willis Plaza. He then scored 4 times when Chennai City was massacred 7-1 by Kingfisher East Bengal.

In January 2020, after one and a half year without club, Dudu returned to Swedish club Oskarshamns AIK. The club confirmed on 15 April 2020, that he had left the club again to return to Finland, where his family was. He then joined Mikkelin Palloilijat on 25 August 2020. After being without a club for over 2 years, he finally joined the club SexyPöxyt for a one-year deal in August 2023.

== Honours ==
Sporting Clube de Goa

- 2. Division: 2002–03

Wisła Kraków

- Ekstraklasa: 2007–08

Debrecen

- Nemzeti Bajnokság I: 2008–09
- Hungarian Super Cup: 2009

Honka

- Finnish League Cup: 2011

=== Individual ===
- NFL Golden Boot: 2004–05
- Veikkausliiga Player of the Month: November 2010
