= Fikru Teferra =

Ethiopian footballer

Personal information
- Full name: Fikru Teferra Lamessa
- Date of birth: 24 January 1986 (age 40)
- Place of birth: Addis Ababa, Ethiopia
- Height: 1.83 m (6 ft 0 in)
- Position: Forward

Senior career*
Years	Team	Apps	(Gls)
2004–2006	Saint George	55	(26)
2006–2007	Orlando Pirates	19	(2)
2007–2009	SuperSport United	46	(5)
2009	FK Mladá Boleslav	9	(0)
2010–2011	SuperSport United	21	(4)
2011	KuPS	8	(0)
2012	Thanh Hóa	21	(3)
2013	Free State Stars	8	(1)
2013–2014	University of Pretoria	6	(0)
2014	Milano United	4	(0)
2014	Atlético de Kolkata	12	(5)
2015	Bidvest Wits	6	(1)
2015	Chennaiyin	11	(1)
2016–2017	Sheikh Russel KC	14	(8)
2018	Highlands Park	6	(0)
2018	Mohammedan SC	4	(0)
2018	Adama City	1	

International career^{‡}
2004–2014	Ethiopia	30	(11)
- * Club domestic league appearances and goals as of 22 January 2015 ‡ National team caps and goals as of 1 July 2017 (UTC)

Fikru Teferra Lemessa (Amharic: ፍቅሩ ተፈራ ለሜሳ; born 24 January 1986) is a retired Ethiopian professional footballer who last played as a forward for Mohammedan SC.

== Club career ==
Teferra moved to the Czech First League club FK Mladá Boleslav on a three-year deal to stay in the Boleslav club, but was released from the contract before the end of his first season with the club.

He signed a contract with ABSA Premiership outfit SuperSport United in 2010, but was released in 2011.

On 12 October 2014, Teferra made history by scoring the first goal in the Indian Super League, a 28th-minute shot from the edge of the penalty box in a 3–0 victory for Atlético de Kolkata over Mumbai City FC. He also opened the scoring in their second match, a 2–0 win at NorthEast United. On 25 October 2014, he was given a two match ban for headbutting Gregory Arnolin in a match against FC Goa.

On 19 December 2014, it was reported that Teferra was released by Atletico de Kolkata due to a hamstring injury.

A month later, on 22 January 2015, after trialing with Bidvest Wits F.C. of the South African Premiership, that Teferra had signed a six-month contract with the club. He later signed for Chennaiyin FC in 2015 Indian Super League. He made 11 appearances and he scored against Atlético de Kolkata.

Fikru signed one-year contract with Bangladesh Premier League side Sheikh Russel KC for 10000 US$ salary per month on 21 February 2016. In March 2018 fikru joined Mohammedan SC of I-League 2nd division.

== International career ==
Teferra was captain of the Ethiopia national team that participated in the 2012 CECAFA Cup.

== Career statistics ==
As of 1 July 2017

Appearances and goals by club, season and competition
Club	Season	League			Cup		League cup		Continental		Other		Total	
Club	Season	Division	Apps	Goals	Apps	Goals	Apps	Goals	Apps	Goals	Apps	Goals	Apps	Goals
Saint George	2004–05	Ethiopian Premier League	25	9	—		—		—		—		25	9
Saint George	2005–06	Ethiopian Premier League	30	17	—		—		—		—		30	17
Saint George	Total		55	26	0	0	0	0	0	0	0	0	55	26
Orlando Pirates	2006–07	South African Premiership	19	2	—		—		—		—		19	2
SuperSport United	2007–08	South African Premiership	25	4	—		—		—		—		25	4
SuperSport United	2008–09	South African Premiership	21	1	—		—		—		—		21	1
SuperSport United	Total		46	5	0	0	0	0	0	0	0	0	46	5
Mladá Boleslav	2009–10	Czech First League	9	0	—		—		—		—		9	0
SuperSport United	2010–11	South African Premiership	21	4	0	0	0	0	1 (Note: Appearance(s) in CAF Champions League)	0	2 (Note: Appearances in Carling Knockout Cup)	0	21	4
KuPS	2011	Veikkausliiga	8	0	1	0	—		—		—		9	0
Thanh Hóa	2012	V.League 1	21	3	0	0	—		—		—		21	3
Free State Stars	2012–13	South African Premiership	8	1	1	0	—		—		—		9	1
University of Pretoria	2013–14	South African Premiership	6	0	0	0	1 (Note: Appearances in MTN 8)	0	—		—		7	0
Marumo Gallants	2013–14	National First Division	4	0	2	0	—		—		—		6	0
Atlético Kolkata	2014	Indian Super League	12	5	0	0	—		—		—		12	5
Bidvest Wits	2014–15	South African Premiership	6	1	2	0	—		—		—		8	1
Chennaiyin FC	2015	Indian Super League	11	1	0	0	—		—		—		11	1
Highlands Park	2016–17	South African Premiership	6	0	1	0	—		—		—		7	0
Sheikh Russel KC	2017–18	Bangladesh Premier League	14	8	—		—		—		—		14	8
Mohammedan SC	2017–18	I-League 2	4	0	0	0	—		—		—		4	0
Career total			240	56	7	0	1	0	1	0	2	0	261	56

== Honours ==
St George

- Ethiopian Premier League: 2004–05, 2005–06
- Ethiopian Super Cup: 2005

Atlético de Kolkata

- Indian Super League: 2014

Chennaiyin FC

- Indian Super League: 2015
