= List of 2015 Indian Super League season roster changes =

2015 Indian Super League season roster changes
- Season: 2015 Indian Super League season

This is a list of all roster changes that occurred prior to the 2015 Indian Super League season.

== Player regulations for 2015 ==
For the 2015 season, the Indian Super League have decided to introduce a salary cap which shall be set at Rs. 20 crores after a meeting that took place on 9 March 2015. Also at the meeting, the organization revealed other roster rules for the 2015 season which were:

- Marquee player: Each team will be required to sign one marquee player for the 2015 season. The marquee player can be the same marquee from last season but teams are also allowed to sign a new one.
- International players: Each team will be allowed to retain between one and five foreign players from the previous season and they're allowed to sign new foreigners without an international players draft.
- Domestic players: Each team will be allowed to retain between one and six Indian domestic players. Indian players who are not retained by their teams will be allowed to freely sign for another Indian Super League team till May 2015. If the players are still without a team by May 2015 then they will be listed as an option in the domestic draft in June.

It was also revealed during the meeting that each team may have a minimum of 22 players in their squad, with the addition of two developmental players. This would mean that each team should have a minimum of one marquee player, eight international players, and thirteen domestic Indian players in which two must be developmental players. Maximum, each team may contain 25 players, with two of the addition three players being allowed to be foreign.

=== Player auction ===
For the first time, the Indian Super League will host a player auction which will consist of 12-15 Indian players who have played for the national team but who did not play in the previous ISL season. Each club will be allowed to add one player from the auction list onto their roster and the players not selected will be instated into the domestic player draft.

== Retained players ==
=== Atletico de Kolkata ===
Foreign players

Position	Player
DF	(Spain) Josemi
MF	(Botswana) Ofentse Nato
MF	(Spain) Borja Fernández

Indian players

Position	Player
DF	(India) Arnab Mondal
DF	(India) Denzil Franco
DF	(India) Nallappan Mohanraj
FW	(India) Baljit Sahni

=== Chennaiyin FC ===
Foreign players

Position	Player
DF	(France) Bernard Mendy
MF	(Brazil) Bruno Pelissari
MF	(Brazil) Elano (Marquee)

Indian Players

Position	Player
DF	(India) Mohammed Ismail
DF	(India) Dhanachandra Singh
MF	(India) Harmanjot Khabra
MF	(India) Jayesh Rane
FW	(India) Balwant Singh
FW	(India) Jeje Lalpekhlua

=== Delhi Dynamos ===
Foreign players

Position	Player
MF	(Netherlands) Hans Mulder
FW	(Brazil) Gustavo Marmentini

Indian players

Position	Player
DF	(India) Anwar Ali
DF	(India) Robert Lalthlamuana
MF	(India) Francis Fernandes
MF	(India) Souvik Chakraborty
FW	(India) Shylo Malsawmtluanga

=== FC Goa ===
Foreign players

Position	Player
DF	(France) Grégory Arnolin
DF	(Portugal) Bruno Pinheiro

Indian players

Position	Player
GK	(India) Laxmikant Kattimani
DF	(India) Debabrata Roy
DF	(India) Narayan Das
MF	(India) Bikramjit Singh
MF	(India) Mandar Rao Desai
MF	(India) Romeo Fernandes

=== Kerala Blasters ===
Foreign players

Position	Player
MF	(Spain) Pulga

Indian players

Position	Player
GK	(India) Sandip Nandy
DF	(India) Sandesh Jhingan
DF	(India) Saumik Dey
DF	(India) Gurwinder Singh
MF	(India) Ishfaq Ahmed
MF	(India) Mehtab Hossain

=== Mumbai City FC ===
Foreign players

Position	Player
DF	(Czech Republic) Pavel Čmovš
MF	(Brazil) André Moritz

Indian players

Position	Player
GK	(India) Subrata Pal
MF	(India) Lalrindika Ralte
FW	(India) Subhash Singh

=== NorthEast United ===
Foreign players

Position	Player
DF	(Portugal) Miguel Garcia
MF	(Zambia) Kondwani Mtonga

Indian players

Position	Player
GK	(India) Rehenesh TP
DF	(India) Aiborlang Khongjee
DF	(India) Robin Gurung
MF	(India) Alen Deory
MF	(India) Boithang Haokip

=== Pune City ===
Foreign players

To be Announced

Indian players

Position	Player
GK	(India) Arindam Bhattacharya
DF	(India) Dharmaraj Ravanan
DF	(India) Pritam Kotal
MF	(India) Manish Maithani
MF	(India) Lenny Rodrigues

== Player auction ==
On 10 July, the player auction took place. Ten players who had featured for the India national team and who did not play in the ISL last season were available to be purchased by the eight teams. Every player who went under the hammer during the auction were sold. The players were sold for a total of 7.22 crores.

Name	Position	Last I-League team	India caps	India goals	Base Price in ₹ (in lakhs)	Sold to	Selling Price in ₹(in lakhs)
(India) Sunil Chhetri	FW	Bengaluru FC	76	46	Rs. 80 Lakh	Mumbai City	Rs. 1.2 crores
(India) Eugeneson Lyngdoh	MF	Bengaluru FC	3	0	Rs. 27.50 Lakh	Pune City	Rs. 1.05 crores
(India) Rino Anto	DF	Bengaluru FC	1	0	Rs. 17.50 Lakh	Atlético de Kolkata	Rs. 90 Lakhs
(India) Thoi Singh	MF	Bengaluru FC	0	0	Rs. 39 Lakh	Chennaiyin	Rs. 86 Lakhs
(India) Arata Izumi	MF	Pune	9	0	Rs. 40 Lakh	Atlético de Kolkata	Rs. 68 Lakhs
(India) Karanjit Singh	GK	Salgaocar	16	0	Rs. 60 Lakh	Chennaiyin	Rs. 60 Lakhs
(India) Satiyasen Singh	MF	Royal Wahingdoh	1	0	Rs. 20 Lakh	NorthEast United	Rs. 56 Lakhs
(India) Robin Singh	FW	Bengaluru FC	17	1	Rs. 40 Lakh	Delhi Dynamos	Rs. 51 Lakhs
(India) Jackichand Singh	FW	Royal Wahingdoh	3	0	Rs. 20 Lakh	Pune City	Rs. 45 Lakhs
(India) Anas Edathodika	DF	Pune	0	0	Rs. 40 Lakh	Delhi Dynamos	Rs. 41 Lakhs

== Domestic draft ==
On 10 July 2015, after the auction, the 2015 ISL Domestic Draft was held, also in Mumbai. 114 players were available for selection with only seven rounds taking place. Only 40 players were selected during the draft as the draft was just used to finalize the domestic quota for all eight teams.

== Player movement and other transactions ==
Date	Name	Moving from	Moving to	Notes
21 March 2015	(India) Gouramangi Singh	Chennaiyin	Pune City	Free
8 April 2015	(India) Denson Devadas	Chennaiyin	Goa	Free
8 April 2015	(India) Chinadorai Sabeeth	Kerala Blasters	Goa	Free
8 April 2015	(India) Lester Fernandez	Atlético de Kolkata	Goa	Free
15 May 2015	(India) Jewel Raja	Goa	Atlético de Kolkata	Free
15 May 2015	(India) Clifford Miranda	Goa	Atlético de Kolkata	Free
15 May 2015	(India) Sushil Kumar Singh	Mumbai City	Atlético de Kolkata	Free
15 May 2015	(India) Mehrajuddin Wadoo	Pune City	Chennaiyin	Free
15 May 2015	(India) Mohammed Rafi	Atlético de Kolkata	Kerala Blasters	Free
15 May 2015	(India) Rowilson Rodrigues	Goa	Mumbai City	Free
15 May 2015	(India) Kingshuk Debnath	Atlético de Kolkata	Mumbai City	Free
15 May 2015	(India) Gabriel Fernandes	Goa	Mumbai City	Free
15 May 2015	(India) Sanju Pradhan	Atlético de Kolkata	NorthEast United	Free
15 May 2015	(India) Holicharan Narzary	Goa	NorthEast United	Free
15 May 2015	(India) Syed Rahim Nabi	Mumbai City	Atlético de Kolkata	Free
15 May 2015	(India) Nadong Bhutia	Mumbai City	Atlético de Kolkata	Free
15 May 2015	(India) Subhasish Roy Chowdhury	Atlético de Kolkata	Delhi Dynamos	Free
15 May 2015	(India) Seminlen Doungel	NorthEast United	Delhi Dynamos	Free
15 May 2015	(India) Godwin Franco	Kerala Blasters	Chennaiyin	Free
15 May 2015	(India) Joaquim Abranches	Pune City	Goa	Free
15 May 2015	(India) Pronay Halder	Unattached	Goa	Free
15 May 2015	(India) Nirmal Chettri	Unattached	Kerala Blasters	Free
15 May 2015	(India) Ramandeep Singh	Unattached	Kerala Blasters	Free
15 May 2015	(India) Raju Gaikwad	Mumbai City	Goa	Free
27 May 2015	(Brazil) Elinton Andrade	(Brazil) Duque de Caxias	Goa	Free
27 May 2015	(Brazil) Reinaldo	(Brazil) EC Internacional	Goa	Free
5 June 2015	(Canada) Iain Hume	Kerala Blasters	Atlético de Kolkata	Free
7 June 2015	(Brazil) Lúcio	(Brazil) Palmeiras	Goa	Marquee
10 June 2015	(England) Chris Dagnall	(England) Leyton Orient	Kerala Blasters	Free
19 June 2015	(Spain) Jaime Gavilán	(Greece) Platanias	Atlético de Kolkata	Free
19 June 2015	(Spain) Tiri	(Spain) Atlético Madrid B	Atlético de Kolkata	Free
20 June 2015	(Brazil) Victor Simões	(Qatar) Umm Salal	Goa	Free
23 June 2015	(Spain) Jofre	Atlético de Kolkata	Goa	Free
24 June 2015	(South Africa) Sameehg Doutie	(South Africa) SuperSport United	Atlético de Kolkata	Free
25 June 2015	(Portugal) Simão	Unattached	NorthEast United	Marquee
26 June 2015	(Ethiopia) Fikru Teferra	Atlético de Kolkata	Chennaiyin	Free
26 June 2015	(Armenia) Apoula Edel	Atlético de Kolkata	Chennaiyin	Free
3 July 2015	(France) Cédric Hengbart	(France) AC Ajaccio	NorthEast United	Free
3 July 2015	(Spain) Juan Calatayud	(Hungary) Videoton	Atlético de Kolkata	Free
3 July 2015	(Cape Verde) Valdo	(Spain) Racing de Santander	Atlético de Kolkata	Free
7 July 2015	(Senegal) Diomansy Kamara	(Italy) Catanzaro	NorthEast United	Free
11 July 2015	(Republic of Ireland) Darren O'Dea	Unattached	Mumbai City	Free
13 July 2015	(Spain) Juan Aguilera Núñez	(Greece) Platanias	Mumbai City	Free
15 July 2015	(Haiti) Sony Norde	(India) Mohun Bagan	Mumbai City	Free
16 July 2015	(India) Nicolau Colaco	(India) Salgaocar	Goa	Free
17 July 2015	(Costa Rica) Yendrick Ruiz	(Costa Rica) Herediano	Pune City	Loan
17 July 2015	(Spain) Javi Lara	(Spain) Eibar	Atlético de Kolkata	Free
18 July 2015	(India) Keenan Almeida	(India) Sporting Goa	Goa	Free
21 July 2015	(England) Steve Simonsen	(Scotland) Rangers	Pune City	Free
21 July 2015	(England) Nicky Shorey	(England) Portsmouth	Pune City	Free
28 July 2015	(India) Luis Barreto	(India) East Bengal	Goa	Loan
28 July 2015	(Tunisia) Selim Benachour	Unattached	Mumbai City	Free
29 July 2015	(Ivory Coast) Didier Zokora	(Turkey) Akhisar Belediyespor	Pune City	Free
29 July 2015	(Portugal) Hélder Postiga	(Spain) Deportivo La Coruña	Atlético de Kolkata	Marquee
30 July 2015	(England) James Bailey	(England) Barnsley	Pune City	Free
30 July 2015	(Haiti) Frantz Bertin	(Greece) Aiginiakos	Mumbai City	Free
30 July 2015	(France) Frédéric Piquionne	(France) US Créteil	Mumbai City	Free
30 July 2015	(Spain) Cristian Bustos	(Spain) Mallorca	Mumbai City	Free
31 July 2015	(Romania) Adrian Mutu	(Romania) Petrolul Ploiești	Pune City	Marquee
31 July 2015	(Spain) Carlos Marchena	(Spain) Deportivo La Coruña	Kerala Blasters	Marquee
2 August 2015	(Argentina) Nicolás Vélez	(Singapore) Warriors	NorthEast United	Free
3 August 2015	(France) Gennaro Bracigliano	Chennaiyin	NorthEast United	Free
4 August 2015	(Portugal) João Coimbra	(Romania) Rapid București	Kerala Blasters	Free
5 August 2015	(Brazil) Éder	(Cyprus) Nea Salamis Famagusta	Chennaiyin	Free
6 August 2015	(Ghana) Francis Dadzie	(Ghana) Bechem United	NorthEast United	Free
