= 2015 Mumbai City FC season =

2015 football season for Mumbai City Football Club

मुंबई सिटी एफ सी Mumbai City
2015 season
- Owner: Ranbir Kapoor, Kayque G. Saldanha, Bimal Parekh
- Head Coach: (France) Nicolas Anelka
- Stadium: DY Patil Stadium
- ISL: 6th
- Top goalscorer: (India) Sunil Chhetri (7 Goals)
- Highest home attendance: 27,435 vs Atlético de Kolkata (1 Nov 2015)
- Lowest home attendance: 17,393 vs Delhi Dynamos (21 Oct 2015)
- Average home league attendance: 22,712
Home colours	Away colours

The 2015 Season is Mumbai City's 2nd season in existence in the Indian Super League. Mumbai City began the season on 5 October 2015 against Pune City, with the opening game of their League campaign. For 2nd season, Nicolas Anelka was announced as the marquee player as well as the manager of the club, replacing Englishman Peter Reid. Mumbai City finished their season at 6th position in ISL 2015.

== Transfers and loans ==
=== Transfers in ===
Note: Flags indicate national team as defined under FIFA eligibility rules. Players may hold more than one non-FIFA nationality

Position	Squad No.	Player	From Club	Ref
DF	2	(India) Ashutosh Mehta	(India) Mumbai	
DF	3	(India) Kingshuk Debnath (On Loan)	(India) Mohun Bagan	
DF	4	(India) Rowilson Rodrigues (On Loan)	(India) Dempo	
DF	6	(Haiti) Frantz Bertin	(Greece) Aiginiakos	
MF	7	(Spain) Cristian Bustos	(Spain) Mallorca	
FW	9	(Martinique) Frédéric Piquionne	(France) US Créteil	
MF	10	(Tunisia) Selim Benachour	(Cyprus) APOEL	
FW	11	(India) Sunil Chhetri	(India) Bengaluru	
FW	12	(India) Subhash Singh (On Loan)	(India) Mohun Bagan	
DF	13	(India) Keegan Pereira	(India) Bengaluru	
MF	14	(Spain) Juan Aguilera	(Greece) Platanias	
MF	15	(India) Pratesh Shirodkar (On Loan)	(India) Sporting Goa	
FW	16	(Haiti) Sony Norde (On Loan)	(India) Mohun Bagan	
MF	17	(India) Brandon Fernandes	(India) Sporting Goa	
DF	18	(Spain) Aitor	(Spain) Mirandés	
MF	19	(India) Gabriel Fernandes	(India) Dempo	
MF	22	(India) Thangjam Singh (On Loan)	(India) Salgaocar	
MF	23	(India) Lalchhuan Mawia (On Loan)	(India) Bengaluru	
GK	24	(India) Debjit Majumder (On Loan)	(India) Mohun Bagan	
DF	27	(Czech Republic) Pavel Čmovš	(Romania) Rapid București	
GK	32	(India) Albino Gomes (On Loan)	(India) Salgaocar	
DF	48	(Republic of Ireland) Darren O'Dea	(England) Blackpool	

=== Transfers out ===
Note: Flags indicate national team as defined under FIFA eligibility rules. Players may hold more than one non-FIFA nationality

Position	Squad No.	Player	To Club	Ref
DF	2	(France) Johan Letzelter		
DK	3	(India) Raju Gaikwad (Loan Return)	(India) East Bengal	
MF	4	(Portugal) Tiago Ribeiro		
DF	5	(Germany) Manuel Friedrich		
MF	6	(Czech Republic) Jan Štohanzl (Loan Return)	(Czech Republic) Mladá Boleslav	
MF	7	(India) Rohit Mirza		
MF	8	(Sweden) Freddie Ljungberg	Retired	
FW	9	(India) Abhishek Yadav	(India) Mumbai	
FW	10	(Argentina) Diego Nadaya	(Argentina) Independiente Rivadavia	
MF	11	(Spain) Javi Fernandez	(Gibraltar) Europa	
FW	13	(India) Ram Malik (Loan Return)	(India) Mohun Bagan	
FW	14	(India) Nadong Bhutia	(India) Royal Wahingdoh	
MF	15	(India) Asif Kottayil	(India) Mohun Bagan	
DF	16	(India) Peter Costa		
DF	17	(India) Deepak Mondal	(India) East Bengal	
FW	18	(India) Sushil Kumar Singh	(India) Atlético de Kolkata	
DF	19	(India) Syed Rahim Nabi	(India) Bharat	
DF	20	(India) Lalrindika Ralte (Loan Return)	(India) East Bengal	
MF	21	(Brazil) André Moritz	(South Korea) Pohang Steelers	
FW	23	(India) Lalrin Fela		
DF	26	(Greece) Ilias Pollalis		
DF	27	(Czech Republic) Pavel Čmovš	(Romania) Rapid București	
GK	31	(India) Ishan Debnath (Loan Return)	(India) United	
GK	41	(Portugal) André Preto	(Portugal) Varzim	

== Players and staff ==
=== Squad ===
As of 3 October 2015 Note: Flags indicate national team as defined under FIFA eligibility rules. Players may hold more than one non-FIFA nationality.

Squad No.	Player	Nationality	Position	Date of Birth (Age)
Goalkeepers
1	Subrata Pal	(India)	GK	24 November 1986 (age 39)
24	Debjit Majumder (On loan from Mohun Bagan)	(India)	GK	22 September 1988 (age 38)
32	Albino Gomes (On loan from Salgaocar)	(India)	GK	7 February 1994 (age 32)
Defenders
3	Ashutosh Mehta	(India)	DF	21 February 1991 (age 35)
4	Kingshuk Debnath (On loan from Mohun Bagan)	(India)	DF	8 May 1985 (age 41)
5	Rowilson Rodrigues	(India)	DF	28 March 1987 (age 39)
6	Frantz Bertin	(Haiti)	DF	30 May 1983 (age 43)
13	Keegan Pereira	(India)	DF	7 November 1987 (age 39)
18	Aitor	(Spain)	DF	23 August 1986 (age 40)
27	Pavel Čmovš	(Czech Republic)	DF	29 June 1990 (age 36)
48	Darren O'Dea	(Republic of Ireland)	DF	4 February 1987 (age 39)
Midfielders
7	Cristian Bustos	(Spain)	MF	29 May 1983 (age 43)
10	Selim Benachour	(Tunisia)	MF	8 September 1981 (age 45)
14	Juan Aguilera	(Spain)	MF	13 September 1985 (age 41)
15	Pratesh Shirodkar (On loan from Sporting Goa)	(India)	MF	19 February 1989 (age 37)
16	Sony Norde (On loan from Mohun Bagan)	(Haiti)	MF	27 July 1989 (age 37)
17	Brandon Fernandes	(India)	MF	20 September 1994 (age 32)
19	Gabriel Fernandes	(India)	MF	22 April 1988 (age 38)
22	Thangjam Singh (On loan from Salgaocar)	(India)	MF	1 March 1987 (age 39)
23	Lalchhuan Mawia (On loan from Bengaluru FC)	(India)	MF	14 April 1989 (age 37)
28	Sampath Kuttymani	(India)	MF	28 September 1986 (age 40)
Forwards
9	Frédéric Piquionne	(Martinique)	FW	8 December 1978 (age 47)
11	Sunil Chhetri	(India)	FW	3 August 1984 (age 42)
12	Subhash Singh	(India)	FW	2 February 1990 (age 36)
39	Nicolas Anelka	(France)	FW	14 March 1979 (age 47)

=== Coaching staff ===
Position	Name
Manager	(France) Nicolas Anelka
Assistant coach	(Spain) Óscar Bruzón
Assistant coach	(India) Alex Ambrose
Goalkeeping coach	(Spain) Martin Ruiz S.
CEO	(India) Indranil Das Blah
Technical Director	(India) Nishant Mehra
Head Analyst	(India) Sujay Sharma

== Kit ==
Supplier: Puma / Sponsor: ACE Group

Home
Away
Goalkeeper 1
Goalkeeper 2

== Indian Super League ==
=== League table ===
Pos	Team	Pld	W	D	L	GF	GA	GD	Pts	Qualification or relegation
4	Delhi Dynamos	14	6	4	4	18	20	−2	22	Advance to ISL Play-offs
5	NorthEast United	14	6	2	6	18	23	−5	20	
6	Mumbai City	14	4	4	6	16	26	−10	16	
7	Pune City	14	4	3	7	17	23	−6	15	
8	Kerala Blasters	14	3	4	7	22	27	−5	13	

Source: Indian Super League standings
Rules for classification: 1) points; 2) goal difference; 3) number of goals scored.

=== Results summary ===
Overall								Home						Away					
Pld	W	D	L	GF	GA	GD	Pts	W	D	L	GF	GA	GD	W	D	L	GF	GA	GD
14	4	4	6	16	26	−10	16	3	2	2	11	8	+3	1	2	4	5	18	−13

Last updated: 4 December 2015.
Source: Matches

=== Results by matchday ===
Matchday	1	2	3	4	5	6	7	8	9	10	11	12	13	14
Ground	A	A	H	H	H	H	H	A	H	A	A	H	A	A
Result	L	D	L	W	W	W	L	D	D	L	L	D	L	W
Position	6	6	7	8	6	2	6	4	6	6	6	7	6	6

Updated to match(es) played on 4 December 2015. Source: Matches
A = Away; H = Home; W = Win; D = Draw; L = Loss

=== Matches ===
Win Draw Loss Upcoming fixture

5 October 2015 1	Pune City	3–1	Mumbai City	Pune
19:00 IST (UTC+5:30)	Tuncay (yellow card) 8' (goal) 12', 56'; Zokora (yellow card) 50'; Kumar (yellow card) 66'; Gurung 68'	Report	Piquionne 34'; Mehta (yellow card) 83'	Stadium: Shree Shiv Chhatrapati Sports Complex; Attendance: 8,734; Referee: Bhuvana Balasubramaniam

10 October 2015 2	Kerala Blasters	0–0	Mumbai City	Kochi
19:00 IST (UTC+5:30)		Report	Bertin (yellow card) 52'	Stadium: Jawaharlal Nehru Stadium; Attendance: 61,483; Referee: Pranjal Banerjee

16 October 2015 3	Mumbai City	0–2	Chennaiyin	Mumbai
19:00 IST (UTC+5:30)	Čmovš (yellow card) 63'	Report	T.Singh (yellow card) 1'; Mendoza 60', 66'	Stadium: DY Patil Stadium; Attendance: 21,321; Referee: Ali Shaban

21 October 2014 4	Mumbai City	2–0	Delhi Dynamos	Mumbai
19:00 IST (UTC+5:30)	Bustos (yellow card) 9'; Chhetri 13', 74' (yellow card) 40'; Aguilera (yellow card) 36'; Čmovš (yellow card) 53'; O'Dea (yellow card) 59'; S.Singh (yellow card) 66'; Shirodkar (yellow card) 76'	Report	Chicão (yellow card) 49'; Chakraborty (yellow card) 56'; Mulder (yellow card) 90'	Stadium: DY Patil Stadium; Attendance: 17,393; Referee: M.B. Santosh Kumar

25 October 2015 5	Mumbai City	2–0	Goa	Mumbai
19:00 IST (UTC+5:30)	Mehta (yellow card) 26'; Chhetri 33' (pen.), (yellow card) 58'; Piquionne 48'; Mawia (yellow card) 52'; Čmovš (yellow card) 71'; Benachour (yellow card) 90'	Report	B.Singh (yellow card) 20'; Gaikwad (yellow card) 32'	Stadium: DY Patil Stadium; Attendance: 23,043; Referee: Ali Shaban

28 October 2015 6	Mumbai City	5–1	NorthEast United	Mumbai
19:00 IST (UTC+5:30)	Chhetri 25' (pen.), 40', 48' (pen.); Norde 51'; Pal (yellow card) 57'; Mehta (yellow card) 74'; Bertin 86'	Report	Haokip 29'; Bikey (yellow card) 43'	Stadium: DY Patil Stadium; Attendance: 21,337; Referee: David Gantar

1 November 2015 7	Mumbai City	1–4	Atlético de Kolkata	Mumbai
19:00 IST (UTC+5:30)	Benachour 71'; Mehta (yellow card) 48'	Report	Hume 34', 45' (pen.), 82'; Borja (yellow card) 52'	Stadium: DY Patil Stadium; Attendance: 27,435; Referee: M.B. Santosh Kumar

6 November 2015 8	Delhi Dynamos	1–1	Mumbai City	Delhi
19:00 IST (UTC+5:30)	Robin 90+4'	Report	Mawia (yellow card) 53'; Piquionne 70'; Benachour (yellow card) 90+4'	Stadium: Jawaharlal Nehru Stadium; Attendance: 14,763; Referee: Tejas Nagenkar

13 November 2015 9	Mumbai City	0–0	Pune City	Mumbai
19:00 IST (UTC+5:30)		Report	Zokora (yellow card) 87'	Stadium: DY Patil Stadium; Attendance: 23,137; Referee: C.R. Srikrishna

17 November 2015 10	Goa	7–0	Mumbai City	Goa
19:00 IST (UTC+5:30)	Haokip 34', 52', 79'; Dudu 42', 64', 67'; Reinaldo 90'	[ Report]		Stadium: Fatorda Stadium; Attendance: 18,573; Referee: Tan Hai

20 November 2015 11	NorthEast United	2–0	Mumbai City	Guwahati
19:00 IST (UTC+5:30)	Bruno 41' (pen.); Raju (yellow card) 65'; Kamara 85', (yellow card) 88'	[ Report]	Rodrigues (yellow card) 39'; Bustos (yellow card) 71'	Stadium: Indira Gandhi Athletic Stadium; Attendance: 15,123; Referee: Tan Hai

26 November 2015 12	Mumbai City	1–1	Kerala Blasters	Mumbai
19:00 IST (UTC+5:30)	Aguilera 25'; Subrata Pal (yellow card) 41'; Čmovš (yellow card) 61'	[ Report]	German 89'	Stadium: DY Patil Stadium; Attendance: 25,317; Referee: Ravshan Irmatov

1 December 2015 13	Chennaiyin	3–0	Mumbai City	Chennai
19:00 IST (UTC+5:30)	Mendoza 9'; Jeje 17'; Mendy 45', (yellow card) 80'; Blasi (yellow card) 60'; Pelissari (yellow card) 62'	[ Report]	Mawia (yellow card) 39'; Rowilson (yellow card) 45'	Stadium: Jawaharlal Nehru Stadium; Attendance: 12,636; Referee: Tejas Nagenkar

4 December 2015 14	Atlético de Kolkata	2–3	Mumbai City	Kolkata
19:00 IST (UTC+5:30)	Hume 45' (pen.); Gavilán (yellow card) 50'; Izumi (yellow card) 81', (goal) 89'; Valdo (yellow card) 88'; Borja (yellow card) 90'	[ Report]	Norde 26', 90'; Čmovš (yellow card) 45'; Bertin (yellow card) 78'; Chhetri 82' (pen.), (yellow card) 86'	Stadium: Salt Lake Stadium; Attendance: 61,276; Referee: Ravshan Irmatov

== Squad statistics ==
As of Match played on 4 December 2015
Source: Indian Super League website

=== Appearances ===
Players with no appearances not included in the list.

Squad No.	Position	Player	Apps	Sub	Total
1	GK	(India) Subrata Pal	11	1	12
3	DF	(India) Ashutosh Mehta	6	5	11
4	DF	(India) Kingshuk Debnath	0	3	3
5	DF	(India) Rowilson Rodrigues	2	2	4
6	DF	(Haiti) Frantz Bertin	9	2	11
7	MF	(Spain) Cristian Bustos	11	1	12
9	FW	(Martinique) Frédéric Piquionne	6	6	12
10	MF	(Tunisia) Selim Benachour	6	5	11
11	FW	(India) Sunil Chhetri	11	0	11
12	FW	(India) Subhash Singh	4	6	10
13	DF	(India) Keegan Pereira	5	1	6
14	MF	(Spain) Juan Aguilera	3	6	9
15	MF	(India) Pratesh Shirodkar	2	5	7
16	MF	(Haiti) Sony Norde	8	4	12
17	MF	(India) Brandon Fernandes	0	2	2
18	DF	(Spain) Aitor	2	2	4
19	MF	(India) Gabriel Fernandes	2	3	5
21	MF	(Brazil) André Moritz	1	0	1
22	MF	(India) Thangjam Singh	1	4	5
23	MF	(India) Lalchhuan Mawia	8	1	9
24	GK	(India) Debjit Majumder	1	1	2
27	DF	(Czech Republic) Pavel Čmovš	12	0	12
28	MF	(India) Sampath Kuttymani	0	3	3
32	GK	(India) Albino Gomes	1	0	1
39	FW	(France) Nicolas Anelka	4	2	6
48	DF	(Republic of Ireland) Darren O'Dea	5	4	9

=== Goal scorers ===
Place	Squad No.	Position	Player	Goals
1	11	FW	(India) Sunil Chhetri	7
2	9	FW	(France) Frédéric Piquionne	3
2	16	MF	(Haiti) Sony Norde	3
4	6	DF	(Haiti) Frantz Bertin	1
4	10	DF	(Tunisia) Selim Benachour	1
4	14	MF	(Spain) Juan Aguilera	1
			Total	16

=== Clean sheets ===
Place	Squad No.	Position	Player	Clean Sheets
1	1	GK	(India) Subrata Pal	3
2	16	GK	(India) Debjit Majumder	1
			Total	4

=== Hat-tricks ===
Squad No.	Position	Player	Against	Date
11	FW	(India) Sunil Chhetri	NorthEast United	28 October 2015

=== Disciplinary record ===
Squad No.	Position	Player	Yellow card	Yellow card Red card	Red card	Note
1	GK	(India) Subrata Pal	2	0	0	
3	DF	(India) Ashutosh Mehta	4	0	0	
5	DF	(India) Rowilson Rodrigues	2	0	0	
6	DF	(Haiti) Frantz Bertin	2	0	0	
7	MF	(Spain) Cristian Bustos	2	0	0	
10	MF	(Tunisia) Selim Benachour	2	0	0	
11	FW	(India) Sunil Chhetri	3	0	0	
12	FW	(India) Subhash Singh	1	0	0	
14	MF	(Spain) Juan Aguilera	1	0	0	
15	MF	(India) Pratesh Shirodkar	1	0	0	
23	FW	(India) Lalchhuan Mawia	3	0	0	
27	DF	(Czech Republic) Pavel Čmovš	5	0	0	
48	DF	(Republic of Ireland) Darren O'Dea	1	0	0	
		Total	29	0	0	

== Home attendance ==
As of match played on 26 November 2015
Source: Indian Super League website

Match	Date	Against	Attendance
1	16 October 2015	Chennayin	21,321
2	21 October 2015	Delhi Dynamos	17,393
3	25 October 2015	Goa	23,043
4	28 October 2015	NorthEast United	21,337
5	1 November 2015	Atlético de Kolkata	27,435
6	13 November 2015	Pune City	23,137
7	26 November 2015	Kerala Blasters	25,317
		Total	158,983

== Awards ==
As of match played on 4 December 2015
Source: Indian Super League website

=== Hero of the Match ===
Match No.	Position	Player	Against	Date
Match 8	FW	(India) Subhash Singh	Kerala Blasters	10 October 2015
Match 17	FW	(India) Sunil Chhetri	Delhi Dynamos	21 October 2015
Match 21	FW	(India) Sunil Chhetri	Goa	25 October 2015
Match 23	FW	(India) Sunil Chhetri	NorthEast United	28 October 2015
Match 31	FW	(Martinique) Frédéric Piquionne	Delhi Dynamos	6 November 2015
Match 54	MF	(Tunisia) Selim Benachour	Atlético de Kolkata	4 December 2015

=== ISL Emerging Player of the Match ===
Match No.	Position	Player	Against	Date
Match 8	MF	(India) Gabriel Fernandes	Kerala Blasters	10 October 2015
Match 13	MF	(India) Lalchhuan Mawia	Chennayin	16 October 2015
Match 21	MF	(India) Gabriel Fernandes	Goa	25 October 2015
Match 23	MF	(India) Lalchhuan Mawia	NorthEast United	28 October 2015
Match 36	DF	(India) Keegan Pereira	Pune City	13 November 2015
Match 47	MF	(India) Thangjam Singh	Kerala Blasters	26 November 2015
