= 2015 Indian Super League =

2nd season of the Indian Super League

Indian Super League
- Season: 2015
- Dates: 3 October – 20 December
- Champions: Chennaiyin (1st title)
- Matches: 61
- Goals: 186 (3.05 per match)
- Top goalscorer: Stiven Mendoza (13 goals)
- Best goalkeeper: Apoula Edel (90 mins per goal)
- Biggest home win: Goa 7–0 Mumbai City (17 November 2015)
- Biggest away win: Kerala Blasters 1–5 Goa (29 November 2015)
- Highest scoring: Goa 7–0 Mumbai City (17 November 2015)
- Longest winning run: Chennaiyin (5 games)
- Longest unbeaten run: Atlético de Kolkata, Delhi Dynamos, Chennaiyin (5 games)
- Longest winless run: Pune City (8 games)
- Longest losing run: Kerala Blasters, Pune City (4 games)
- Highest attendance: 68,340; Atlético de Kolkata 2–1 Chennaiyin (16 December)
- Lowest attendance: 7,965; Chennaiyin 3–0 Atletico de Kolkata (12 December) (played in Pune)
- Total attendance: 1,653,808
- Average attendance: 27,111

The 2015 Hero Indian Super League was the second season of the Indian Super League, a professional football league played in India since 2014. The season featured eight teams. The regular season kicked off on 3 October and ended on 6 December, while the finals began on 11 December, which will conclude with the final match on 20 December. The defending champions Atlético de Kolkata were eliminated in the semi-finals by Chennaiyin FC. The final was played between Goa and Chennaiyin on 20 December 2015 at the Fatorda Stadium in Goa. Chennayin were crowned as champions defeating Goa 3–2 in the final.

== Teams ==
Locations of the ISL Teams

=== Stadiums and locations ===
Team	City/State	Stadium	Capacity
Atlético de Kolkata	Kolkata, West Bengal	Salt Lake Stadium	68,000
Chennaiyin	Chennai, Tamil Nadu	Jawaharlal Nehru Stadium	40,000
Delhi Dynamos	Delhi	Jawaharlal Nehru Stadium	60,000
Goa	Margao, Goa	Fatorda Stadium	19,500
Kerala Blasters	Kochi, Kerala	Jawaharlal Nehru Stadium	60,000
Mumbai City	Mumbai, Maharashtra	DY Patil Stadium	55,000
NorthEast United	Guwahati, Assam	Indira Gandhi Athletic Stadium	35,000
Pune City	Pune, Maharashtra	Balewadi Stadium	12,000

=== Personnel and sponsorship ===
Team	Head coach	Captains	Kit manufacture	Shirt sponsors
Atlético de Kolkata	(Spain) Antonio López Habas	(Spain) Borja Fernandez	Nivia	Birla Tyres
Chennaiyin	(Italy) Marco Materazzi	(Brazil) Elano Blumer	TYKA	Ozone Group
Delhi Dynamos	(Brazil) Roberto Carlos	(Netherlands) Hans Mulder	Puma	EKANA Sportz City
Goa	(Brazil) Zico	(Brazil) Lúcio	Adidas	Prime Markets
Kerala Blasters	(Republic of Ireland) Terry Phelan	(England) Peter Ramage	Puma	Muthoot Group
Mumbai City	(France) Nicolas Anelka	(Haiti) Frantz Bertin	Puma	ACE Group
NorthEast United	(Venezuela) César Farías	(France) Cédric Hengbart	Performax	HTC
Pune City	(England) David Platt	(Ivory Coast) Didier Zokora	Adidas	Fair and Handsome

=== Managerial changes ===
Team	Outgoing manager	Manner of departure	Date of vacancy	Position in table	Incoming manager	Date of appointment
Kerala Blasters	(England) David James	Contract finished	20 December 2014	Pre-Season	(England) Peter Taylor	9 May 2015
Pune City	(Italy) Franco Colomba	Contract finished	20 December 2014	Pre-Season	(England) David Platt	27 May 2015
NorthEast United	(New Zealand) Ricki Herbert	Contract finished	20 December 2014	Pre-Season	(Venezuela) César Farías	1 July 2015
Mumbai City	(England) Peter Reid	Contract finished	20 December 2014	Pre-Season	(France) Nicolas Anelka	3 July 2015
Delhi Dynamos	(Netherlands) Harm van Veldhoven	Contract finished	20 December 2014	Pre-Season	(Brazil) Roberto Carlos	5 July 2015
Kerala Blasters	(England) Peter Taylor	Mutual consent	27 October 2015	8th	(England) Trevor Morgan	27 October 2015
Kerala Blasters	(England) Trevor Morgan	Interim manager	1 November 2015	8th	(Republic of Ireland) Terry Phelan	1 November 2015

=== Marquee players ===
Team	Marquee
Atlético de Kolkata	(Portugal) Hélder Postiga
Chennaiyin	(Brazil) Elano
Delhi Dynamos	(Brazil) Roberto Carlos
Goa	(Brazil) Lúcio
Kerala Blasters	(Spain) Carlos Marchena
Mumbai City	(France) Nicolas Anelka
NorthEast United	(Portugal) Simão Sabrosa
Pune City	(Romania) Adrian Mutu

== Foreign players ==
Besides the marquee player, each Indian Super League side must sign at least eight foreign players with the maximum capped at 10.

Atlético de Kolkata (10)	Chennaiyin (10)	Delhi Dynamos (10)	Goa (9)
(Serbia) Dejan Lekić (Botswana) Ofentse Nato (Spain) Borja Fernández (Canada) Iain Hume (Spain) Jaime Gavilán (Spain) Tiri (South Africa) Sameehg Doutie (Spain) Juan Calatayud (Cape Verde) Valdo (Spain) Jorge Alonso	(France) Bernard Mendy (Brazil) Bruno Pelissari (Ethiopia) Fikru Teferra (Armenia) Apoula Edel (Brazil) Éder (Brazil) Raphael Augusto (Brazil) Mailson Alves (Italy) Manuele Blasi (Italy) Alessandro Potenza (Colombia) Stiven Mendoza	(Netherlands) Hans Mulder (Brazil) Gustavo Marmentini (Brazil) Chicão (France) Florent Malouda (Norway) John Arne Riise (England) Adil Nabi (Spain) Toni Doblas (Ghana) Richard Gadze (Netherlands) Serginho Greene (Brazil) Vinícius	(France) Grégory Arnolin (Portugal) Elinton Andrade (Brazil) Reinaldo (Spain) Jofre (Brazil) Leo Moura (Brazil) Jonatan Lucca (Nigeria) Dudu Omagbemi (Brazil) Luciano Sabrosa (Brazil) Rafael Coelho
Kerala Blasters (10)	Mumbai City (9)	NorthEast United (10)	Pune City (10)
(Spain) Pulga (England) Chris Dagnall (Portugal) João Coimbra (Brazil) Bruno Perone (Brazil) Rodrigo Arroz (England) Peter Ramage (England) Antonio German (Spain) Josu (England) Marcus Williams (England) Stephen Bywater	(Republic of Ireland) Darren O'Dea (Spain) Juan Aguilera (Haiti) Sony Norde (Czech Republic) Pavel Čmovš (Tunisia) Selim Benachour (Haiti) Frantz Bertin (Spain) Cristian Bustos (France) Frédéric Piquionne (Spain) Aitor	(France) Cédric Hengbart (Spain) Bruno (Portugal) Silas (Senegal) Diomansy Kamara (Argentina) Nicolás Vélez (France) Gennaro Bracigliano (Ghana) Francis Dadzie (Cameroon) André Bikey (Argentina) Carlos Javier López (Senegal) Victor Mendy	(Costa Rica) Yendrick Ruiz (England) Steve Simonsen (England) Nicky Shorey (Ivory Coast) Didier Zokora (England) James Bailey (Turkey) Tuncay (England) Roger Johnson (Argentina) Diego Colotto (Nigeria) Kalu Uche (Netherlands) Wesley Verhoek

== Regular season ==
Pos	Team	Pld	W	D	L	GF	GA	GD	Pts	Qualification or relegation
1	Goa	14	7	4	3	29	20	+9	25	Advance to ISL Play-offs
2	Atlético de Kolkata	14	7	2	5	26	17	+9	23	Advance to ISL Play-offs
3	Chennaiyin (C)	14	7	1	6	25	15	+10	22	Advance to ISL Play-offs
4	Delhi Dynamos	14	6	4	4	18	20	−2	22	Advance to ISL Play-offs
5	NorthEast United	14	6	2	6	18	23	−5	20	
6	Mumbai City	14	4	4	6	16	26	−10	16	
7	Pune City	14	4	3	7	17	23	−6	15	
8	Kerala Blasters	14	3	4	7	22	27	−5	13	

Source: Indian Super League standings
Rules for classification: 1) points; 2) goal difference; 3) number of goals scored.
(C) Champions

== Playoffs ==
=== Bracket ===
Semi-Finals
1	Goa	0	3	3
4	Delhi Dynamos	1	0	1
2	Atlético de Kolkata	0	2	2
3	Chennaiyin	3	1	4

Final
1	Goa	2
3	Chennaiyin	3

== Statistics ==
As of match played on 20 December 2015
Source: Indian Super League website

=== Scoring ===
==== Top scorers ====
Rank	Player	Club	Goals
1	(Colombia) Stiven Mendoza	Chennaiyin	13
2	(Canada) Iain Hume	Atlético de Kolkata	11
3	(Brazil) Reinaldo	Goa	7
3	(India) Sunil Chhetri	Mumbai City	7
5	(Grenada) Antonio German	Kerala Blasters	6
5	(England) Chris Dagnall	Kerala Blasters	6
5	(India) Jeje Lalpekhlua	Chennaiyin	6
8	(Argentina) Nicolás Vélez	NorthEast United	5
8	(India) Arata Izumi	Atlético de Kolkata	5

==== Top Indian scorers ====
Rank	Player	Club	Goals
1	Sunil Chhetri	Mumbai City	7
2	Jeje Lalpekhlua	Chennaiyin	6
3	Arata Izumi	Atlético de Kolkata	5
4	Robin Singh	Delhi Dynamos	4
4	Thongkhosiem Haokip	Goa	4
4	Mohammed Rafi	Kerala Blasters	4
7	Mandar Rao Desai	Goa	3
8	Eugeneson Lyngdoh	Pune City	2
8	Romeo Fernandes	Goa	2

==== Hat-tricks ====
Player	For	Against	Result	Date
(Colombia) Stiven Mendoza	Chennaiyin	Goa	4–0	11 October 2015
(India) Sunil Chhetri	Mumbai City	NorthEast United	5–1	28 October 2015
(Canada) Iain Hume	Atlético de Kolkata	Mumbai City	4–1	1 November 2015
(Nigeria) Dudu Omagbemi	Goa	Mumbai City	7–0	17 November 2015
(India) Thongkhosiem Haokip	Goa	Mumbai City	7–0	17 November 2015
(Colombia) Stiven Mendoza	Chennaiyin	Kerala Blasters	4–1	21 November 2015
(Canada) Iain Hume	Atlético de Kolkata	Pune City	4–1	27 November 2015
(Brazil) Reinaldo	Goa	Kerala Blasters	5–1	29 November 2015

=== Assists ===
Rank	Player	Club	Assists	Ref
1	?	?	?	

=== Clean Sheets ===
Rank	Player	Club	Clean sheets
1	(Armenia) Apoula Edel	Chennaiyin	6
2	(India) Rehenesh TP	NorthEast United	4
3	(India) Subrata Pal	Mumbai City	3
3	(Spain) Toni Doblas	Delhi Dynamos	3
3	(India) Laxmikant Kattimani	Goa	3
6	(England) Steve Simonsen	Pune City	2
6	(England) Stephen Bywater	Kerala Blasters	2
8	(India) Sanjiban Ghosh	Delhi Dynamos	1
8	(Brazil) Elinton Andrade	Goa	1
8	(India) Debjit Majumder	Mumbai City	1
8	(India) Amrinder Singh	Atlético de Kolkata	1

== Attendance ==
As of matches played on 20 December 2015
Source: Indian Super League website

=== Average home attendances ===
Note: Table lists in order of average attendance.

Pos	Team	Total	High	Low	Average	Change
1	Kerala Blasters	364,054	62,087	32,313	52,008	+5.9%
2	Atlético de Kolkata	405,659	68,340	35,437	50,707	+12.3%
3	NorthEast United	172,115	30,319	15,123	24,588	−11.0%
4	Chennaiyin	159,372	29,923	12,636	22,767	+3.0%
5	Mumbai City	158,983	27,435	17,393	22,712	+0.5%
6	Delhi Dynamos	155,274	25,212	14,299	19,409	+23.5%
7	Goa	169,590	19,796	17,634	18,843	+4.3%
8	Pune City	68,761	9,057	7,965	8,595	+9.4%
	League total	1,653,808	68,340	7,965	27,111	+6.4%

Source: Official club websites and Indian Super League

"Change" refers to change in figures wrt previous edition of the tournament.

=== Highest attendances ===
Rank	Home team	Score	Away team	Attendance	Date	Stadium
1	Atlético de Kolkata	2 – 1	Chennaiyin	68,340	16 December 2015	Salt Lake Stadium
2	Kerala Blasters	0 – 1	Delhi Dynamos	62,087	18 October 2015	Jawaharlal Nehru Stadium (Kochi)
3	Kerala Blasters	0 – 0	Mumbai City	61,483	10 October 2015	Jawaharlal Nehru Stadium (Kochi)
4	Atlético de Kolkata	2 – 3	Mumbai City	61,276	4 December 2015	Salt Lake Stadium
5	Atlético de Kolkata	2 – 1	Kerala Blasters	61,237	13 October 2015	Salt Lake Stadium
6	Kerala Blasters	2 – 3	Atlético de Kolkata	60,251	10 November 2015	Jawaharlal Nehru Stadium (Kochi)
7	Kerala Blasters	3 – 1	NorthEast United	60,017	6 October 2015	Jawaharlal Nehru Stadium (Kochi)
8	Atlético de Kolkata	4 – 0	Goa	51,047	22 November 2015	Salt Lake Stadium
9	Atlético de Kolkata	4 – 1	Pune City	48,721	27 November 2015	Salt Lake Stadium
10	Kerala Blasters	1 – 1	Chennaiyin	47,852	31 October 2015	Jawaharlal Nehru Stadium (Kochi)

Source:Official club websites and Indian Super League.

== Awards ==
As of matches played on 20 December 2015

Source: Indian Super League website

=== Hero of the Match ===
Match	Hero of the Match		Match	Hero of the Match	
Match	Player	Club	Match	Player	Club
Match 1	(Portugal) Hélder Postiga	Atlético de Kolkata	Match 31	(Martinique) Frédéric Piquionne	Mumbai City
Match 2	(India) Mandar Rao Desai	Goa	Match 32	(Cameroon) André Bikey	NorthEast United
Match 3	(Turkey) Tuncay	Pune City	Match 33	(Brazil) Lúcio	Goa
Match 4	(Spain) Josu	Kerala Blasters	Match 34	(England) Antonio German	Kerala Blasters
Match 5	(India) Arata Izumi	Atlético de Kolkata	Match 35	(India) Rehenesh TP	NorthEast United
Match 6	(Norway) John Arne Riise	Delhi Dynamos	Match 36	(Ivory Coast) Didier Zokora	Pune City
Match 7	(England) Roger Johnson	Pune City	Match 37	(India) Robin Singh	Delhi Dynamos
Match 8	(India) Subhash Singh	Mumbai City	Match 38	(India) Cavin Lobo	Kerala Blasters
Match 9	(Colombia) Stiven Mendoza	Chennaiyin	Match 39	(Nigeria) Dudu Omagbemi	Goa
Match 10	(Spain) Javi Lara	Atlético de Kolkata	Match 40	(South Africa) Sameehg Doutie	Atlético de Kolkata
Match 11	(France) Florent Malouda	Delhi Dynamos	Match 41	(Brazil) Chicão	Delhi Dynamos
Match 12	(Spain) Jofre	Goa	Match 42	(Senegal) Diomansy Kamara	NorthEast United
Match 13	(Colombia) Stiven Mendoza	Chennaiyin	Match 43	(Colombia) Stiven Mendoza	Chennaiyin
Match 14	(Turkey) Tuncay	Pune City	Match 44	(South Africa) Sameehg Doutie	Atlético de Kolkata
Match 15	(India) Sandesh Jhingan	Kerala Blasters	Match 45	(France) Bernard Mendy	Chennaiyin
Match 16	(Armenia) Apoula Edel	Chennaiyin	Match 46	(Brazil) Leo Moura	Goa
Match 17	(India) Sunil Chhetri	Mumbai City	Match 47	(Spain) Juan Aguilera	Mumbai City
Match 18	(Brazil) Leo Moura	Goa	Match 48	(Canada) Iain Hume	Atlético de Kolkata
Match 19	(Argentina) Nicolás Vélez	NorthEast United	Match 49	(Brazil) Gustavo Marmentini	Delhi Dynamos
Match 20	(France) Bernard Mendy	Chennaiyin	Match 50	(Brazil) Reinaldo	Goa
Match 21	(India) Sunil Chhetri	Mumbai City	Match 51	(France) Bernard Mendy	Chennaiyin
Match 22	(England) Nicky Shorey	Pune City	Match 52	(Argentina) Nicolás Vélez	NorthEast United
Match 23	(India) Sunil Chhetri	Mumbai City	Match 53	(England) Chris Dagnall	Kerala Blasters
Match 24	(India) Anas Edathodika	Delhi Dynamos	Match 54	(Tunisia) Selim Benachour	Mumbai City
Match 25	(India) Mandar Rao Desai	Goa	Match 55	(Armenia) Apoula Edel	Chennaiyin
Match 26	(England) Chris Dagnall	Kerala Blasters	Match 56	(India) Romeo Fernandes	Goa
Match 27	(Canada) Iain Hume	Atlético de Kolkata	Match 57	(Brazil) Gustavo Marmentini	Delhi Dynamos
Match 28	(Norway) John Arne Riise	Delhi Dynamos	Match 58	(Colombia) Stiven Mendoza	Chennaiyin
Match 29	(England) Sanchez Watt	Kerala Blasters	Match 59	(Nigeria) Dudu Omagbemi	Goa
Match 30	(Brazil) Leo Moura	Goa	Match 60	(Armenia) Apoula Edel	Chennaiyin
			Match 61	(Spain) Jofre	Goa

=== ISL Emerging Player of the Match ===
Match	ISL Emerging Player of the Match		Match	ISL Emerging Player of the Match	
Match	Player	Club	Match	Player	Club
Match 1	(India) Jeje Lalpekhlua	Chennaiyin	Match 31	(India) Zodingliana Ralte	Delhi Dynamos
Match 2	(India) Sanjiban Ghosh	Delhi Dynamos	Match 32	(India) Mohammed Rafique	Atlético de Kolkata
Match 3	(India) Israil Gurung	Pune City	Match 33	(India) Eugeneson Lyngdoh	Pune City
Match 4	(India) Mohammed Rafi	Kerala Blasters	Match 34	(India) Rino Anto	Atlético de Kolkata
Match 5	(India) Keenan Almeida	Goa	Match 35	(India) Satiyasen Singh	NorthEast United
Match 6	(India) Abhishek Das	Chennaiyin	Match 36	(India) Keegan Pereira	Mumbai City
Match 7	(India) Fanai Lalrempuia	Pune City	Match 37	(India) Jewel Raja	Atlético de Kolkata
Match 8	(India) Gabriel Fernandes	Mumbai City	Match 38	(India) Sandesh Jhingan	Kerala Blasters
Match 9	(India) Jayesh Rane	Chennaiyin	Match 39	(India) Thongkhosiem Haokip	Goa
Match 10	(India) Arata Izumi	Atlético de Kolkata	Match 40	(India) Thoi Singh	Chennaiyin
Match 11	(India) Jackichand Singh	Pune City	Match 41	(India) Seminlen Doungel	Delhi Dynamos
Match 12	(India) Sanju Pradhan	NorthEast United	Match 42	(India) Satiyasen Singh	NorthEast United
Match 13	(India) Lalchhuan Mawia	Mumbai City	Match 43	(India) Thoi Singh	Chennaiyin
Match 14	(India) Dharmaraj Ravanan	Pune City	Match 44	(India) Mohammed Rafique	Atlético de Kolkata
Match 15	(India) C.K. Vineeth	Kerala Blasters	Match 45	(India) Jeje Lalpekhlua	Chennaiyin
Match 16	(India) Boithang Haokip	NorthEast United	Match 46	(India) Sanju Pradhan	NorthEast United
Match 17	(India) Anas Edathodika	Delhi Dynamos	Match 47	(India) Thangjam Singh	Mumbai City
Match 18	(India) Rahul Bheke	Kerala Blasters	Match 48	(India) Arnab Mondal	Atlético de Kolkata
Match 19	(India) Amrinder Singh	Atlético de Kolkata	Match 49	(India) Satiyasen Singh	NorthEast United
Match 20	(India) Karanjit Singh	Chennaiyin	Match 50	(India) Mandar Rao Desai	Goa
Match 21	(India) Gabriel Fernandes	Mumbai City	Match 51	(India) Thoi Singh	Chennaiyin
Match 22	(India) Rahul Bheke	Kerala Blasters	Match 52	(India) Siam Hanghal	NorthEast United
Match 23	(India) Lalchhuan Mawia	Mumbai City	Match 53	(India) Cavin Lobo	Kerala Blasters
Match 24	(India) Rino Anto	Atlético de Kolkata	Match 54	(India) Rino Anto	Atlético de Kolkata
Match 25	(India) Thongkhosiem Haokip	Goa	Match 55	(India) Jeje Lalpekhlua	Chennaiyin
Match 26	(India) Karanjit Singh	Chennaiyin	Match 56	(India) Pronay Halder	Goa
Match 27	(India) Amrinder Singh	Atlético de Kolkata	Match 57	(India) Sehnaj Singh	Delhi Dynamos
Match 28	(India) Satiyasen Singh	NorthEast United	Match 58	(India) Jeje Lalpekhlua	Chennaiyin
Match 29	(India) Rahul Bheke	Kerala Blasters	Match 59	(India) Mandar Rao Desai	Goa
Match 30	(India) Thoi Singh	Chennaiyin	Match 60	(India) Nallappan Mohanraj	Atlético de Kolkata
			Match 61	(India) Thongkhosiem Haokip	Goa

=== End-of-season awards ===
Award	Player	Club
Hero of the League	(Colombia) Stiven Mendoza	Chennaiyin
Fittest player of the League	(Canada) Iain Hume	Atletico de Kolkata
Golden Boot	(Colombia) Stiven Mendoza	Chennaiyin
Golden Glove	(Armenia) Apoula Edel	Chennaiyin
Emerging Player of the League	(India) Jeje Lalpekhlua	Chennaiyin
Fair Play Award	Mumbai City	

Team of the Year
Goalkeeper	(Armenia) Apoula Edel (Chennaiyin FC)			
Defenders	(India) Mehrajuddin Wadoo (Chennaiyin FC)	(India) Arnab Mondal (Atlético de Kolkata)	(Norway) John Arne Riise (Delhi Dynamos)	(India) Mandar Rao Dessai (FC Goa)
Midfielders	(Brazil) Léo Moura (FC Goa)		(France) Florent Malouda (Delhi Dynamos)	(Ecuador) Joffre Guerrón (FC Goa)
Forwards	(Colombia) Stiven Mendoza (Chennaiyin FC)		(Canada) Iain Hume (Atlético de Kolkata)	(India) Sunil Chhetri (Mumbai City FC)

== See also ==
- 2015 Atlético de Kolkata season
- 2015 Chennaiyin FC season
- 2015 Delhi Dynamos FC season
- 2015 FC Goa season
- 2015 Kerala Blasters FC season
- 2015 Mumbai City FC season
- 2015 NorthEast United FC season
- 2015 FC Pune City season
