= 2015 Atlético de Kolkata season =

2nd season in existence of Atlético de Kolkata

Atlético de Kolkata
2015 season
- Head Coach: (Spain) Antonio López Habas
- Stadium: Salt Lake Stadium
- ISL: Semi-Finals
- Top goalscorer: (Canada) Iain Hume (11 goals)
- Highest home attendance: 68,340 (vs Chennaiyin; 16 December 2015)
- Lowest home attendance: 35,437 (vs Chennaiyin; 18 November 2015)
- Average home league attendance: 51,056

The 2015 season was Atlético de Kolkata's second season in the Indian Super League. They started their second season as the defending champions, and ended the season as the semi-finalists.

== Background ==
On 15 May 2015, Atlético de Kolkata's board announced that they would retain former Bolivia and Valencia CF manager Antonio Lopez Habas for the 2015 season. It was under him that the team had won the title in 2014. However, in spite of their first season, the team decided in retaining just 7 players from their squad of 2014, including 3 foreigners. The team signed 5 Indians and 10 foreigners from the open market. This was followed by 7 more domestic signings from the Draft.

On 29 July 2015, the team signed Portuguese international Hélder Postiga as its marquee player.

On 25 August 2015, the team went on pre season tour to Madrid, Spain where they trained for a month.

== Pre-season friendlies ==
3 September 2015 Exhibition match	Atlético de Kolkata (India)	9 – 0	(Spain) Gimnástica Segoviana - B	Segovia, Spain
	Postiga; Hume; Raja; Gavilán; Izumi; Valdo	Report		Stadium: Los Angeles de San Rafael ground

10 September 2015 Exhibition match	Atlético de Kolkata (India)	2 – 0	(Spain) Alcobendas CF	Madrid, Spain
	Borja; Hume

16 September 2015 Exhibition match	Atlético de Kolkata (India)	3 – 1	(Spain) CDA Navalcarnero	Madrid, Spain
	Lara; Postiga		N/A

27 September 2015 Exhibition match	Atlético de Kolkata (India)	4 – 2	(India) Aryan F.C.	Kolkata, India
	Gavilán; Singh; Lara; Sahni	Report	N/A	Stadium: Mohun Bagan Club Ground

== Players ==
On 5 June 2015, the team acquired Canadian international forward Iain Hume, whose five goals had helped Kerala to the final of the previous season. In the second season's domestic draft, Atlético de Kolkata had the first pick, choosing Pune F.C. goalkeeper Amrinder Singh for a fee of 4.5 lakhs; their most expensive purchase was that of defender Augustin Fernandes for 26 lakhs. On 29 July, with García released due to his injury record, the team brought in Portugal international forward Hélder Postiga as their new marquee player; aged 32, he became the youngest such player in the league. They finalized their squad of 26, for the year, by 29 July 2015.

On 4 November, the team decided to sign last year final's goalscorer Mohammed Rafique replacing Lalchhawnkima who was ruled out due to Dengue.

On 11 November 2015, the team announced the signing of Serbian international Dejan Lekić to replace injured Josemi

On 16 November 2015, the team announced replacement for another injured player Javi Lara, who found it hard to recover quickly from a groin injury. For him, another Spanish midfielder Jorge Alonso was signed.

=== Current squad ===
As of 18 November 2015.

No.	Nat.	Name	Date of birth (age)
Goalkeepers
1	(Spain)	Juan Calatayud	21 December 1979 (age 46)
13	(India)	Amrinder Singh (on loan from Pune)	27 May 1993 (age 32)
26	(India)	Kunzang Bhutia	3 January 1994 (age 32)
Defenders
3	(India)	Nallappan Mohanraj	23 February 1989 (age 36)
4	(Spain)	Tiri	9 January 1991 (age 35)
5	(India)	Arnab Mondal (on loan from East Bengal)	25 September 1989 (age 36)
12	(India)	Denzil Franco	30 June 1986 (age 39)
19	(India)	Syed Rahim Nabi	14 December 1985 (age 40)
20	(India)	Rino Anto (on loan from Bengaluru FC)	3 January 1988 (age 38)
24	(India)	Augustin Fernandes (on loan from Salgaocar)	13 October 1988 (age 37)
Midfielders
8	(Spain)	Jaime Gavilán	12 May 1985 (age 40)
10	(Spain)	Borja Fernández	14 January 1981 (age 45)
11	(Cape Verde)	Valdo	23 April 1981 (age 44)
15	(India)	Clifford Miranda	11 July 1982 (age 43)
16	(India)	Jewel Raja	19 January 1990 (age 36)
21	(India)	Arata Izumi	31 July 1982 (age 43)
22	(South Africa)	Sameehg Doutie	31 May 1989 (age 36)
23	(Botswana)	Ofentse Nato	1 October 1989 (age 36)
85	(Spain)	Jorge Alonso	5 January 1985 (age 41)
Forwards
6	(India)	Baljit Sahni (on loan from East Bengal)	12 January 1987 (age 39)
7	(Canada)	Iain Hume	30 October 1983 (age 42)
9	(Portugal)	Hélder Postiga	2 August 1982 (age 43)
14	(India)	Nadong Bhutia	25 November 1993 (age 32)
18	(India)	Sushil Kumar Singh (on loan from Shillong Lajong)	3 January 1982 (age 44)
28	(India)	Mohammed Rafique (on loan from East Bengal)	20 September 1992 (age 33)
30	(Serbia)	Dejan Lekić	7 June 1985 (age 40)

== Competitions ==
=== Indian Super League ===
==== League table ====
Pos	Team	Pld	W	D	L	GF	GA	GD	Pts	Qualification or relegation
1	Goa	14	7	4	3	29	20	+9	25	Advance to ISL Play-offs
2	Atlético de Kolkata	14	7	2	5	26	17	+9	23	Advance to ISL Play-offs
3	Chennaiyin (C)	14	7	1	6	25	15	+10	22	Advance to ISL Play-offs
4	Delhi Dynamos	14	6	4	4	18	20	−2	22	Advance to ISL Play-offs
5	NorthEast United	14	6	2	6	18	23	−5	20	

Source: Indian Super League standings
Rules for classification: 1) points; 2) goal difference; 3) number of goals scored.
(C) ISL Cup winners

==== Results summary ====
Overall								Home						Away					
Pld	W	D	L	GF	GA	GD	Pts	W	D	L	GF	GA	GD	W	D	L	GF	GA	GD
16	8	2	6	28	21	+7	26	5	0	3	16	9	+7	3	2	3	12	12	0

Last updated: 16 December 2015.
Source: Matches

==== Results by round ====
Round	1	2	3	4	5	6	7	8	9	10	11	12	13	14
Ground	A	A	H	A	A	H	A	H	A	A	H	H	H	H
Result	W	D	W	L	L	L	W	L	W	D	W	W	W	L
Position	1	4	4	1	3	5	6	5	6	4	2	1	1	2

Updated to match(es) played on 4 December 2015. Source: Matches
A = Away; H = Home; W = Win; D = Draw; L = Loss

=== Matches ===
==== League Stage ====
3 October 2015 1	Chennaiyin FC	2 – 3	Atlético de Kolkata	Chennai
19:00 IST	Khabra (yellow card) 6'; Jeje 31'; L.Ralte (yellow card) 59'; Elano 89' (pen.); B.Singh (yellow card) 90+1'	Report	Postiga 13', 70'; Sahni (yellow card) 39'; Valdo 76'; Mondal (yellow card) 84'	Stadium: Jawaharlal Nehru Stadium (Chennai); Attendance: 29,923; Referee: Matt Conger

7 October 2015 2	FC Goa	1 – 1	Atlético de Kolkata	Goa
19:00 IST	Devadas (yellow card) 58'; Almeida 81' (yellow card) 90'; Jofre (yellow card) 83'; V.Fernandes (yellow card) 90+5'	Report	Izumi 13'; Borja (yellow card) 42'; Gavilán (yellow card) 45'; Nato (yellow card) 48'; Sahni (yellow card) 61' (red card) 62'; A.Fernandes (yellow card) 84'; Valdo (yellow card) 88'	Stadium: Fatorda Stadium; Attendance: 17,634; Referee: Santosh Kumar

13 October 2015 3	Atlético de Kolkata	2 – 1	Kerala Blasters FC	Kolkata
19:00 IST	Izumi 6'; Lara 53'	Report	Josu (yellow card) 44'; R.Singh (yellow card) 46'; Hossain (yellow card) 63' (yellow-red card) 89'; Dagnall 80'	Stadium: Salt Lake Stadium; Attendance: 61,237; Referee: Matt Conger

17 October 2015 4	FC Pune City	1 – 0	Atlético de Kolkata	Pune
19:00 IST	J.Singh 2'	Report	Mohanraj (yellow card) 56'; Josemi (yellow card) 73'	Stadium: Balewadi Sports Complex; Attendance: 9,087

23 October 2015 5	NorthEast United FC	1 – 0	Atlético de Kolkata	Guwahati
19:00 IST	Vélez 77'	Report	Anto (yellow card) 22'; Nato (yellow card) 68'; Mondal (yellow card) 90'	Stadium: Indira Gandhi Athletic Stadium; Attendance: 24,689

29 October 2015 6	Atlético de Kolkata	0 – 1	Delhi Dynamos FC	Kolkata
19:00 IST	Sahni (yellow card) 45+1'; Hume (yellow card) 56'	Report	Riise (yellow card) 45'; Chakraborty (yellow card) 71' (yellow-red card) 80'; Chicão (yellow card) 86'; Dos Santos 90+3' (yellow card) 90+4'	Stadium: Salt Lake Stadium; Attendance: 41,145

1 November 2015 7	Mumbai City FC	1 – 4	Atlético de Kolkata	Mumbai
19:00 IST	Ashutosh (yellow card) 48'; Benachour 71'	Report	Hume 34', 45' (pen.), 82'; Borja (yellow card) 52'; Augustin 77' (yellow card) 89'	Stadium: DY Patil Stadium; Attendance: 27,435; Referee: Santosh Kumar

7 November 2015 8	Atlético de Kolkata	0 – 1	NorthEast United FC	Kolkata
19:00 IST		Report	Simao 9' (pen.); Carlos (yellow card) 20'; Bruno (yellow card) 74'; Silas (yellow card) 83'	Stadium: Salt Lake Stadium; Attendance: 38,456; Referee: D.J. Ganter

10 November 2015 9	Kerala Blasters FC	2 – 3	Atlético de Kolkata	Kochi
19:00 IST	German 42' (pen.), 85'; Mehtab (yellow card) 52'	Report	Mohanraj 29' (yellow card) 68'; Denzil (yellow card) 41'; Izumi 84', 90'	Stadium: Jawaharlal Nehru Stadium; Attendance: 60,251; Referee: Hai Tan

14 November 2015 10	Delhi Dynamos FC	1 – 1	Atlético de Kolkata	Delhi
19:00 IST	Gadze 61'; Anas (yellow card) 70'	Report	Hume 27'; Tiri (yellow card) 73'; Gavilan (yellow card) 85'; Rino (yellow card) 88'	Stadium: Jawaharlal Nehru Stadium; Attendance: 18,336; Referee: N.R.Gamini

18 November 2015 11	Atlético de Kolkata	2 – 1	Chennaiyin FC	Kolkata
19:00 IST	Doutie 45'; Hume 63'; Valdo (yellow card) 90'	Report	Augusto 27'; D. Singh (yellow card) 45'; Fikru (yellow card) 80'; Augusto (yellow card) 82'; Pelissari (yellow card) 94'	Stadium: Salt Lake Stadium; Attendance: 35,437; Referee: N.R.Gamini

22 November 2015 12	Atlético de Kolkata	4 – 0	FC Goa	Kolkata
19:00 IST	Doutie 20', 78'; Borja 22'; Hume 68' (pen.)	Report	Devadas (yellow card) 58'; Colaco (yellow card) 67'; Lúcio (yellow card) 81'	Stadium: Salt Lake Stadium; Attendance: 51,047; Referee: Arumughan Rowan

27 November 2015 13	Atlético de Kolkata	4 – 1	FC Pune City	Kolkata
19:00 IST	Hume 9', 47', 83' (yellow card) 31'; Nato (yellow card) 38'; Lekić 90'	Report	Lyngdoh (yellow card) 27'; Manish (yellow card) 45'; Mutu 86'	Stadium: Salt Lake Stadium; Attendance: 48,721; Referee: Ali Shaban

4 December 2015 14	Atlético de Kolkata	2 – 3	Mumbai City FC	Kolkata
19:00 IST	Hume 45' (pen.); Gavilán (yellow card) 49'; Tiri (yellow card) 81'; Valdo (yellow card) 88'; Izumi 90'; Borja (yellow card) 90'	Report	Norde 26', 90'; Čmovš (yellow card) 45'; Bertin (yellow card) 78'; Chhetri 82' (pen.) (yellow card) 86'; Subrata (yellow card) 88'	Stadium: Salt Lake Stadium; Attendance: 61,726; Referee: Ravshan Irmatov

==== Semi-finals ====
12 December 2015 First Leg	Chennaiyin FC	3 – 0	Atlético de Kolkata	Pune
19:00 IST	Blasi (yellow card) 37'; Pelissari 38'; Lalpekhlua 57'; Mendoza 68'	Report		Stadium: Balewadi Sports Complex; Attendance: 7,965; Referee: Santosh Kumar

16 December 2015 Second Leg	Atlético de Kolkata	2 – 1 (2 – 4 agg.)	Chennaiyin FC	Kolkata
19:00 IST	Lekić 22'; Mohanraj (yellow card) 55'; Augustin (yellow card) 66'; Tiri (yellow card) 84'; Hume 87'	Report	Elano (yellow card) 37'; Thoi (yellow card) 55'; Fikru 90+'	Stadium: Salt Lake Stadium; Attendance: 68,340; Referee: Yudai Yamamoto

== Player statistics ==
=== Goal Scorers ===
No.	Position	Nation	Player	Goal(s)	Appearance(s).
7	FW	(Canada)	Hume	11	16
21	MF	(India)	Izumi	5	11
22	MF	(South Africa)	Doutie	3	12
9	FW	(Portugal)	Postiga	2	1
30	FW	(Serbia)	Lekić	2	6
11	MF	(Cape Verde)	Valdo	1	10
10	MF	(Spain)	Borja	1	15
~~2~~	MF	(Spain)	Lara	1	6
24	DF	(India)	Augustin	1	13
3	DF	(India)	Mohanraj	1	6
Total				28	–

Last updated: 16 December 2015.
Source: Matches

=== Assists Table ===
No.	Position	Nation	Player	Assist(s)	Appearance(s).
22	MF	(South Africa)	Doutie	6	12
8	MF	(Spain)	Gavilán	3	16
7	FW	(Canada)	Hume	3	16
~~2~~	MF	(Spain)	Lara	1	6
10	MF	(Spain)	Borja	1	15
21	MF	(India)	Izumi	1	11
23	MF	(Botswana)	Nato	1	12
30	FW	(Serbia)	Lekić	1	6
Total				17	–

Last updated: 16 December 2015.
Source: Matches
