= Frédéric Piquionne =

French footballer (born 1978)

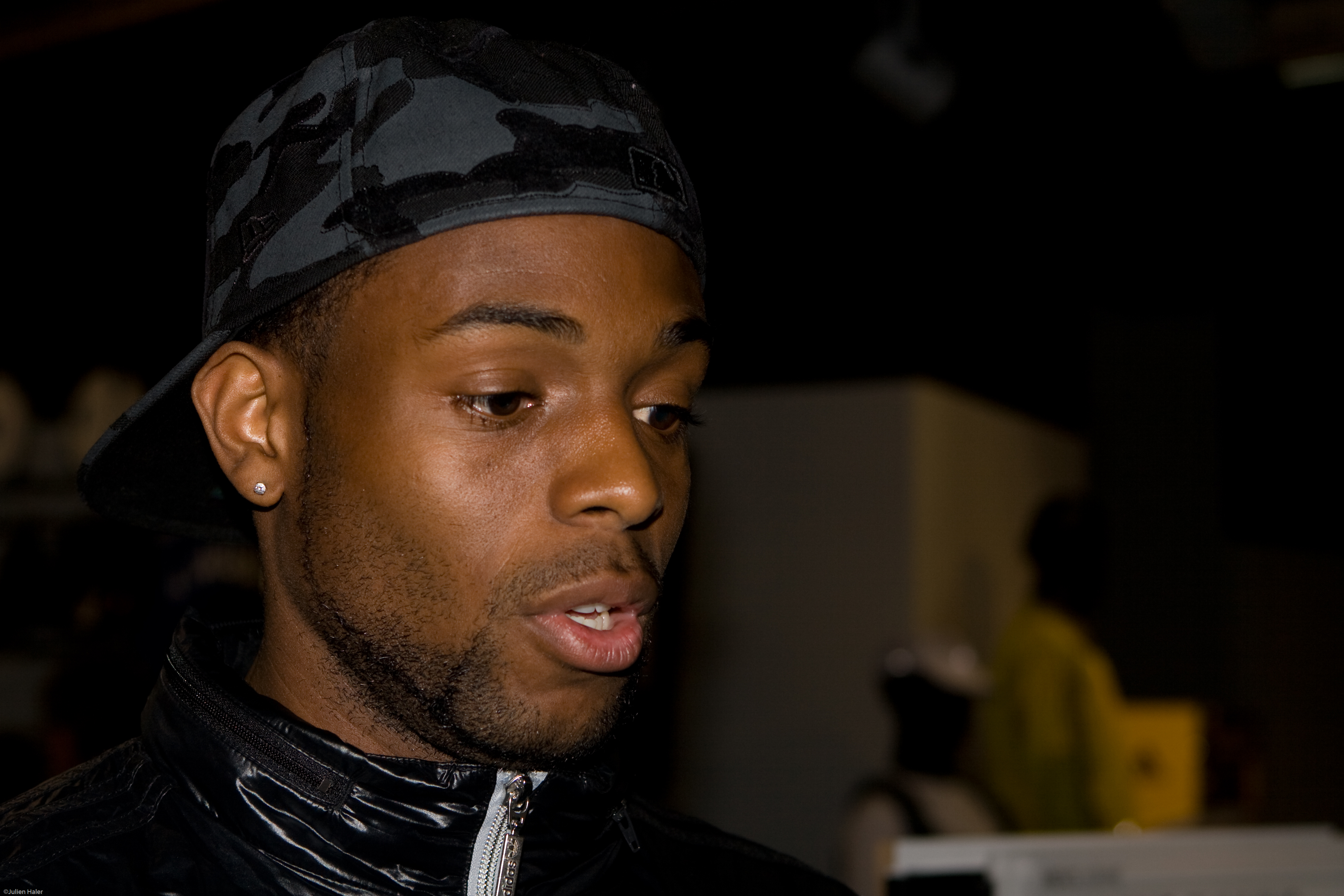
- Piquionne in 2009

Personal information
- Full name: Frédéric Michel Piquionne
- Date of birth: 8 December 1978 (age 47)
- Place of birth: Nouméa, New Caledonia, France
- Height: 1.88 m (6 ft 2 in)
- Position: Striker

Youth career
- 1996–1999: Golden Star

Senior career*
| Years | Team | Apps | (Gls) |
| 2000–2001 | Nîmes | 8 | (3) |
| 2001–2004 | Rennes | 83 | (18) |
| 2004–2007 | Saint-Étienne | 89 | (23) |
| 2007–2008 | Monaco | 46 | (12) |
| 2008–2010 | Lyon | 19 | (2) |
| 2009–2010 | → Portsmouth (loan) | 34 | (5) |
| 2010–2013 | West Ham United | 54 | (8) |
| 2012 | → Doncaster Rovers (loan) | 8 | (2) |
| 2013–2014 | Portland Timbers | 24 | (1) |
| 2014–2015 | Créteil | 29 | (8) |
| 2015 | Mumbai City | 12 | (3) |
| Total | | 406 | (85) |

International career
| 2007 | France B | 1 | (0) |
| 2007 | France | 1 | (0) |
| 2012–2014 | Martinique | 9 | (2) |
- * Club domestic league appearances and goals

Frédéric Michel Piquionne (born 8 December 1978) is a French former professional footballer who played as a forward.

Piquionne's former clubs are Golden Star of Martinique, Nîmes, Rennes, Saint-Étienne, Monaco, Lyon, Portsmouth, West Ham United, Doncaster Rovers, Portland Timbers and Mumbai City.

At international level, Piquionne played for the Martinique national team. He represented them in the run up to the 2013 CONCACAF Gold Cup and was named in the 2012 Caribbean Cup squad. He also played once for France in a friendly against Austria in 2007.

== Early life ==
Piquionne was born in Nouméa, New Caledonia.

== Club career ==
=== Early career ===
In 1995 at age 17, Piquionne played in the youth teams of Paris FC at Charenton. Not really convincing, he left the city to settle in Martinique, in Fort-de-France. There, he played football in the Division d'Honneur for amateur club Golden Star and then joined JS Morne Blanc. For three years he worked as a shoe salesman in a store located in downtown Fort-de-France.

However, his impressive performances encouraged his coach Jules Eustache (a former intern at the National Institute of Football and professional footballer) to direct him towards Nîmes. The club recruited him during the summer of 2000 and offered him his first professional contract. During the following summer and after an excellent season in Ligue 2 with Nîmes, he caught the eye of Ligue 1's Rennes.

The first time he played in the French first division was 28 July 2001 against Auxerre (0–5). In his first season in the first division, Piquionne scored 3 goals in 20 matches. In his second season, 2002–03, he scored ten goals under the coaching of Vahid Halilhodžić. New coach László Bölöni then arrived, and the rapport between them was poor, ending the 2003–04 season less than satisfactorily.

=== Saint-Étienne ===
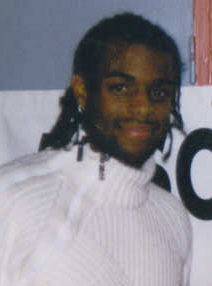
Piquionne during the 2004–05 season

Newly promoted club Saint-Étienne were interested in him, and he did not have any hesitation accepting the chance to play for this new team. In the summer of 2004, Élie Baup was hired as manager and brought in Piquionne on a five-year deal. He wore the number 9, "a number that gives responsibilities" according to his coach. Immediately, Piquionne was appreciated by the club's supporters, and finished the season with 11 goals, the highest total of his career and the club finished in sixth place.

The 2005–06 season was much more difficult. Piquionne remained as an undisputed starter but his performance in front of goal was lacking. He scored only 6 goals in 34 games and the club finished in the lower half of the table. After this second season, he had a more productive 2006–07 season, scoring six goals and six assists in the first half of the season. He also received two more red cards and missed a total of four games in 19 days. He partnered the Brazilian Ilan up front.

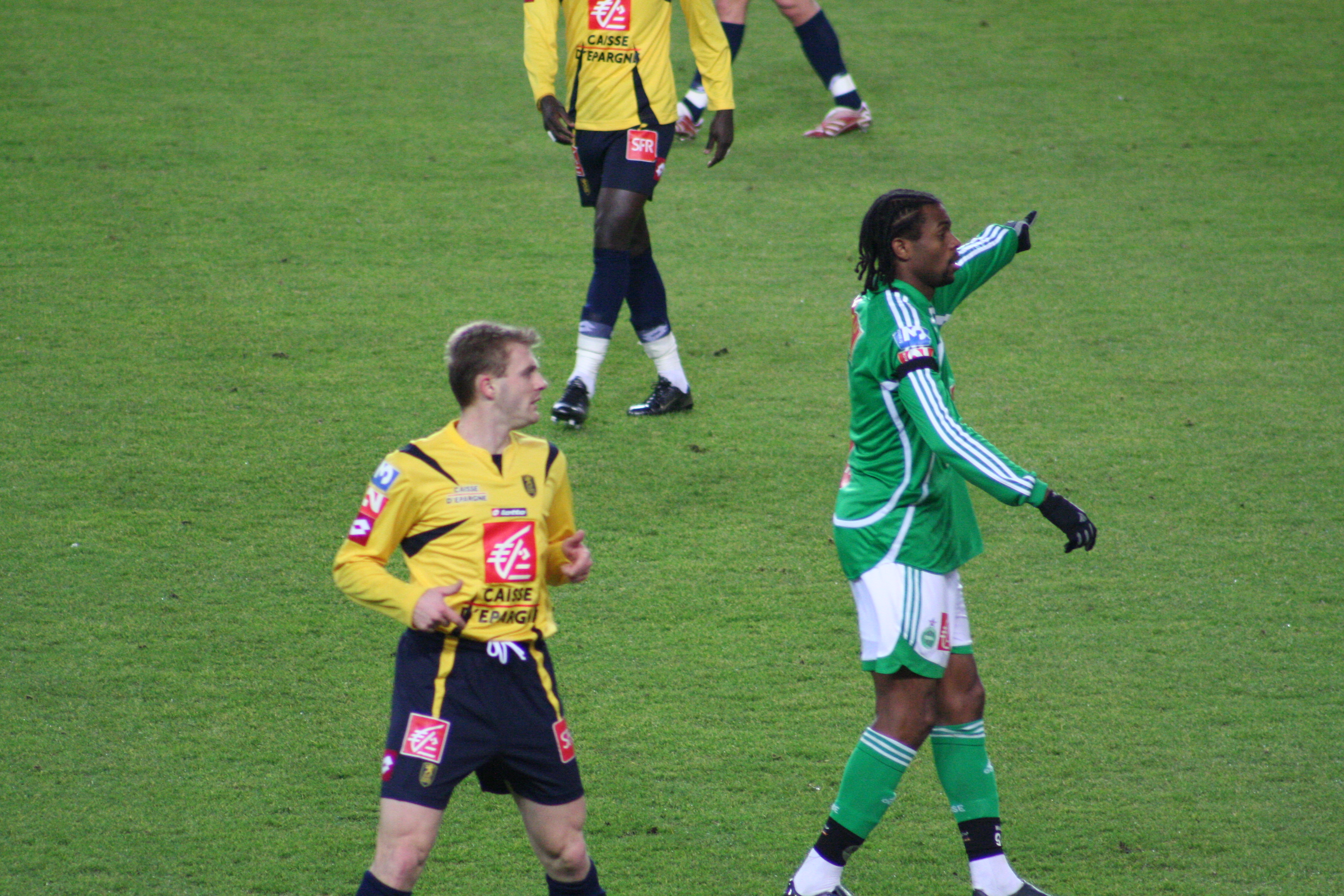
Piquionne (right) playing for Saint-Étienne in 2007

Piquionne was under contract with Saint-Étienne until June 2009. However, following his excellent performance, many European clubs were on alert, including Lyon, who allegedly promised to triple his salary at that time. An offer of €5.5 million by the club Lyon bid to sign him was considered "ridiculous" by Bernard Caiazzo. Caiazzo refused to let the player depart to a local rival. Piquionne then declared that he was being "treated like a slave" by Caiazzo. Eventually, Lyon signed Milan Baroš instead, but after all that was said, Piquionne said that he was ready to retire if the club refused to transfer him.

His time at Saint-Étienne ended with an altercation with a supporter who criticised him for attending a Lyon match. Piquionne assaulted him, leaving him with a broken nose. Piquionne was sentenced to a €1,500 and also ordered to pay the same to the victim. Despite being disliked by fans, coach Ivan Hašek admitted that his team missed the striker.

=== Monaco and Lyon ===
On 31 January 2007, Piquionne moved to Monaco on loan. The contract included an option to purchase, valued at €6 million. On 3 February 2007, he played his first Ligue 1 match for Monaco, against Auxerre. At the end of the season, Monaco remained in Ligue 1 and despite his disappointing performances, they exercised their buyout clause. On 10 November 2007, he played his 200th match in Ligue 1, against Strasbourg at the Stade Louis-II (3-0).

On 29 July 2008, after a friendly match at Annecy, Piquionne signed a four-year deal for €4.5 million with Lyon. He wore the number 39 shirt and scored his first goal in the UEFA Champions League against Fiorentina.

=== Portsmouth ===
On 5 August 2009, it was confirmed that Piquionne would join English Premier League club Portsmouth on a season-long loan. On his Pompey debut, against Rangers at Fratton Park in a friendly, he scored two goals in a 2–0 win. Piquionne made his first Premier League start for Portsmouth on 15 August 2009, a 0–1 loss to Fulham on the first day of the season. His first competitive goal for Portsmouth came in a 4–1 League Cup win against Hereford United on 25 August 2009. He scored his first Premier League goal four days later in another 4–0 win, this time at home to Wigan Athletic. Piquionne scored 11 goals in all competitions during his stint at Portsmouth, including scoring two goals against Birmingham City in the FA Cup to ensure Portsmouth progressed to the FA Cup semi-finals. On 11 April 2010, Piquionne scored the first goal in a 2–0 win over Tottenham Hotspur to send Portsmouth into the FA Cup final for the second time in three seasons. His goalscoring form at Portsmouth led Piquionne to feel as though he had finally found his feet in English football despite enduring a patchy start to his Premier League career.

=== West Ham United ===
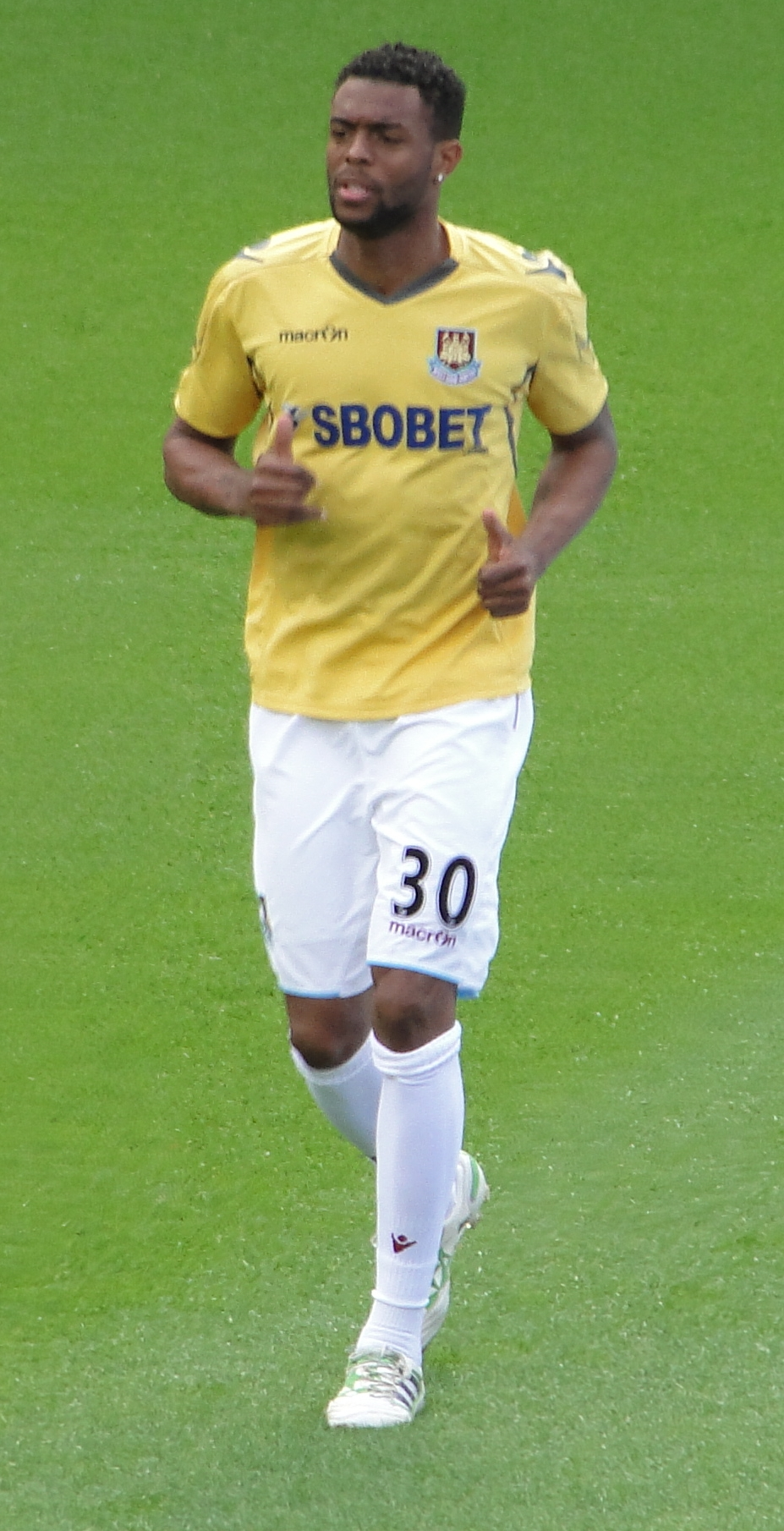
Piquionne with West Ham United in 2011

On 16 July 2010, Piquionne joined West Ham United, managed by his former manager at Portsmouth, Avram Grant, for a €1.2 million transfer fee and a €450,000 bonus. He signed a three-year contract, becoming West Ham's third summer signing. He made his Premier League debut with West Ham on 14 August in a 3–0 loss to Aston Villa, coming on as a second-half substitute for Radoslav Kováč. He scored his first goal for West Ham in a 2–1 win against Sunderland in the third round of the League Cup at the Stadium of Light on 21 September 2010. He scored his first Premier League goal for West Ham in a 1–0 win against local rivals Tottenham on 25 September 2010. This goal was also the 10,000th goal scored in the Premier League with a Nike-manufactured football. On 22 January 2011, Piquionne was sent off in a vital Premier League game against Everton for jumping into the crowd after scoring to put the Hammers 2–1 up in the 86th minute; Everton later scored to draw the match 2–2. West Ham were relegated to the Championship at the end of the season.

=== Doncaster Rovers ===
On 6 March 2012, Piquionne was loaned by West Ham to fellow Championship club Doncaster Rovers on an initial one-month loan. On the same day, he made his debut in a 2–1 away win against Nottingham Forest, scoring his first goal with a 30-yard shot to put Rovers 1–0 ahead. He played eight games for Doncaster, scoring two goals and at the end of the season returned to West Ham as Doncaster were relegated to League One.

=== Portland Timbers ===
Piquionne left England to join Major League Soccer (MLS) team Portland Timbers in the United States. He signed a one-year contract on 28 February 2013. Piquionne made his debut for Portland on 16 March 2013, coming on as a substitute against rivals Seattle Sounders FC at CenturyLink Field. On 29 May 2013, he scored four goals in the first half of a US Open Cup match against the USL Pro team Wilmington Hammerheads. He re-signed for the Timbers on 7 January 2014, but was waived from the team's roster on 13 May 2014.

=== Creteil ===
On 4 August 2014, Piquionne returned to France to sign with Créteil in Ligue 2 for the 2014–15 season.

=== Mumbai City ===
In July 2015, Indian Super League club Mumbai City confirmed the signing of Piquionne for the upcoming season. The club, then managed by Peter Reid, had also signed Cristian Bustos and Frantz Bertin, and featured Nicolas Anelka as player-coach. He scored three goals in his 12 appearances for the club.

== International career ==
Instead of representing FIFA member New Caledonia in Oceania, Piquionne represented Martinique. He may have been called during the 2003 CONCACAF Gold Cup qualification but he did not play the final tournament. As Martinique is not a member of FIFA, he was eligible to play for France for whom he was called up in a squad to play Lithuania on 24 March 2007 in a Euro 2008 qualifying match, but did not play. He made his international debut for France in a friendly against Austria on 28 March 2007, coming on as a substitute in the 78th minute for Abou Diaby at the Stade de France. He played for France B against Slovakia in August 2007, but never represented the senior team again.

Piquionne also represented Martinique at the 2012 Caribbean Cup, where he scored in the nation's opening game, a 1–0 victory over Cuba. In total, he played five matches and scored two goals in the tournament.

== Coaching career ==
Following his departure from Mumbai City and retirement from playing, Piquionne returned to Creteil as a coach in January 2016. In November 2021, he was appointed as assistant at FA Women's Super League side Everton. In February 2022, he left the club following the sacking of Jean-Luc Vasseur.

== After football ==
He worked as a pundit for Canal+ during the 2016 Summer Olympics.

== Career statistics ==
Appearances and goals by club, season and competition
| Club | Season | League | | | National Cup | | League Cup | | Continental | | Other | | Total | |
| Club | Season | Division | Apps | Goals | Apps | Goals | Apps | Goals | Apps | Goals | Apps | Goals | Apps | Goals |
|---|---|---|---|---|---|---|---|---|---|---|---|---|---|---|
| Nîmes | 2001–02 | Ligue 2 | 8 | 3 | 0 | 0 | 1 | 0 | — | | — | | 9 | 3 |
| Rennes | 2001–02 | Ligue 1 | 20 | 3 | 2 | 2 | 3 | 2 | 4 | 2 | — | | 29 | 9 |
| Rennes | 2002–03 | Ligue 1 | 31 | 10 | 4 | 2 | 0 | 0 | — | | — | | 35 | 12 |
| Rennes | 2003–04 | Ligue 1 | 32 | 5 | 3 | 0 | 1 | 0 | — | | — | | 36 | 5 |
| Rennes Total | | | 83 | 18 | 9 | 2 | 4 | 2 | 4 | 2 | 0 | 0 | 100 | 24 |
| Saint-Étienne | 2004–05 | Ligue 1 | 37 | 11 | 1 | 2 | 4 | 3 | — | | — | | 42 | 16 |
| Saint-Étienne | 2005–06 | Ligue 1 | 34 | 6 | 1 | 0 | 1 | 0 | 4 | 1 | — | | 40 | 7 |
| Saint-Étienne | 2006–07 | Ligue 1 | 18 | 5 | 1 | 0 | 0 | 0 | — | | — | | 19 | 5 |
| Saint-Étienne Total | | | 89 | 22 | 3 | 2 | 5 | 3 | 4 | 1 | 0 | 0 | 101 | 28 |
| Monaco | 2006–07 | Ligue 1 | 14 | 5 | — | | — | | — | | — | | 14 | 5 |
| Monaco | 2007–08 | Ligue 1 | 32 | 7 | 2 | 0 | 2 | 1 | — | | — | | 41 | 8 |
| Monaco Total | | | 46 | 12 | 2 | 0 | 2 | 1 | 0 | 0 | 0 | 0 | 55 | 13 |
| Lyon | 2008–09 | Ligue 1 | 19 | 2 | 3 | 1 | 1 | 0 | 3 | 1 | 0 | 0 | 26 | 4 |
| Portsmouth (loan) | 2009–10 | Premier League | 34 | 5 | 7 | 3 | 4 | 3 | — | | — | | 45 | 11 |
| West Ham United | 2010–11 | Premier League | 34 | 6 | 4 | 2 | 3 | 1 | — | | — | | 41 | 9 |
| West Ham United | 2011–12 | Championship | 20 | 2 | 0 | 0 | 1 | 0 | — | | 0 | 0 | 21 | 2 |
| West Ham United Total | | | 54 | 8 | 4 | 2 | 4 | 1 | 0 | 0 | 0 | 0 | 62 | 11 |
| Doncaster Rovers (loan) | 2011–12 | Championship | 8 | 2 | — | | — | | — | | — | | 8 | 2 |
| Portland Timbers | 2013 | MLS | 21 | 1 | 3 | 5 | — | | — | | 2 | 1 | 26 | 7 |
| Portland Timbers | 2014 | MLS | 3 | 0 | 0 | 0 | — | | — | | — | | 3 | 0 |
| Portland Timbers Total | | | 24 | 1 | 3 | 5 | 0 | 0 | 0 | 0 | 2 | 1 | 29 | 7 |
| Créteil | 2014–15 | Ligue 2 | 29 | 8 | 1 | 0 | 3 | 1 | — | | — | | 33 | 9 |
| Mumbai City | 2015 | Indian Super League | 12 | 3 | — | | — | | — | | — | | 12 | 3 |
| Career total | | | 406 | 86 | 32 | 15 | 24 | 11 | 11 | 4 | 2 | 1 | 475 | 117 |

== International Goals ==
Scores and results list Martinique's goal tally first.

| No. | Date | Venue | Opponent | Score | Result | Competition |
|---|---|---|---|---|---|---|
| 1 | 8 December 2012 | Sir Vivian Richards Stadium, St. John's, Antigua and Barbuda | Cuba | 1–0 | 1–0 | 2012 Caribbean Cup |
| 2 | 12 December 2012 | Sir Vivian Richards Stadium, St. John's, Antigua and Barbuda | French Guiana | 2–0 | 3–1 | 2012 Caribbean Cup |

== Honours ==
Portsmouth

- FA Cup runner-up: 2009–10
