= Lalchhuanmawia =

Indian footballer

Personal information
- Full name: Lalchhuanmawia Fanai
- Date of birth: 14 April 1989 (age 37)
- Place of birth: Lengpui, Mizoram, India
- Height: 1.80 m (5 ft 11 in)
- Position: Left back

Senior career*
Years	Team	Apps	(Gls)
2010–2012	JCT	20	(0)
2012–2014	Shillong Lajong	30	(1)
2014–2017	Bengaluru	28	(0)
2015	→ Mumbai City (loan)	10	(0)
2017–2019	Pune City	16	(0)
2019–2020	Odisha	3	(0)
2020–2021	Chennaiyin	4	(0)
2021–2022	RoundGlass Punjab	9	(0)

International career^{‡}
2015	India	4	(0)
- * Club domestic league appearances and goals as of 18:27, 8 March 2022 (UTC) ‡ National team caps and goals as of 15:15, 3 October 2018 (UTC)

Lalchhuanmawia Fanai (born 14 April 1989), is an Indian professional footballer who plays as a defender.

== Career ==
=== JCT ===
Chhuantea started his professional career from Punjab-based team JCT FC, where he has played for them Punjab Football League and in I-League for 2 years. He has also represented Punjab in Santosh Trophy.

=== Shillong Lajong ===
Chhuantea played for Shillong Lajong from 2012 to 2014 and made 30 appearances. On 4 November 2012, Chhuantea made his debut for Lajong against United S.C. in which Lajong won by 3–2; after that Chhuantea score the winning goal for his new team Lajong won by 1–0 against HAL Bangalore.

=== Bengaluru ===
In July 2014, it was announced that Chhuantea signed one-year deal with Bengaluru FC. On 24 January 2015, Chhuantea made his debut for Bengaluru FC against Pune FC at Bangalore Football Stadium. In his debut season with Bengaluru, he has made 16 appearances and has helped them to win I-League. On 4 February 2015, Chhuantea made his AFC Champions League debut against Johor Darul Ta'zim at Larkin Stadium Malaysia. He signed a two-year contract with Bengaluru at the end of the season, which would keep him at the club until the end of the 2016-17 I-League season.

==== Mumbai City (loan) ====
In July 2015 Chhuantea was drafted to play for Mumbai City FC in the 2015 Indian Super League. He made total 9 appearances for Mumbai City in whole ISL season.

=== Pune City ===
On 23 July 2017, Fanai has been picked up by FC Pune City for 2017-18 ISL season.

=== Chennaiyin FC ===
In September 2020, Fanai signed a one-year deal with Chennaiyin FC.

== International career ==
On 11 June 2015, Chhuantea made his debut for the India national football team in the 2018 FIFA World Cup Qualifier against Oman.

== Career statistics ==
=== Club ===
As of 8 March 2022

Club	Season	League			Federation Cup		AFC		Total	
Club	Season	Division	Apps	Goals	Apps	Goals	Apps	Goals	Apps	Goals
Shillong Lajong	2012–13	I-League	17	0	0	0	—		17	0
Shillong Lajong	2013–14	I-League	13	0	0	0	—		13	0
Bengaluru	2014–15	I-League	16	0	1 (Note: Appearances in the Super Cup)	0	5 (Note: Appearances in the AFC Champions League) (Note: Appearances in the AFC Cup)	0	22	0
Mumbai City (loan)	2015	Indian Super League	9	0	0	0	—		9	0
Bengaluru	2015–16	I-League	12	0	0	0	8	0	20	0
Mumbai City (loan)	2016	Indian Super League	1	0	0	0	—		1	0
Bengaluru	2016–17	I-League	0	0	0	0	1	0	1	0
Pune City	2017–18	Indian Super League	9	0	0	0	—		9	0
Pune City	2018–19	Indian Super League	7	0	0	0	—		7	0
Odisha	2019–20	Indian Super League	3	0	0	0	—		3	0
Chennaiyin	2020–21	Indian Super League	4	0	0	0	—		4	0
RoundGlass Punjab	2021–22	I-League	3	0	0	0	—		3	0
Career total			94	0	1	0	14	0	109	0

=== International ===
National team	Year	Apps	Goals
India	2015	3	0
India	2016	1	0
Total		4	0

== Honours ==
Bengaluru FC

- Indian Federation Cup: 2014–15
- I-League: 2015–16

India

- SAFF Championship: 2015
