= André Moritz =

Brazilian footballer (born 1986)

Personal information
- Full name: André Francisco Moritz
- Date of birth: 6 August 1986 (age 40)
- Place of birth: Florianópolis, Brazil
- Height: 1.87 m (6 ft 2 in)
- Positions: Attacking midfielder; winger

Youth career
- 2001–2003: Avaí
- 2003–2005: Internacional

Senior career*
Years	Team	Apps	(Gls)
2005–2006	Internacional	17	(5)
2006–2007	Fluminense	4	(3)
2007–2010	Kasımpaşa	61	(16)
2010–2011	Kayserispor	21	(2)
2011–2012	Mersin İdman Yurdu	32	(4)
2012–2013	Crystal Palace	27	(5)
2013–2014	Bolton Wanderers	23	(7)
2014	Mumbai City	7	(3)
2015–2016	Pohang Steelers	11	(4)
2015	→ Mumbai City (loan)	13	(7)
2016	Buriram United	0	(0)
2016–2018	Denizlispor	29	(6)
2018–2019	Avaí	24	(0)
2019	Londrina	9	(0)
2020	Confiança	13	(0)
2022	Hougang United	18	(8)
Total		309	(70)
- * Club domestic league appearances and goals

André Francisco Moritz (born 6 August 1986) is a Brazilian former professional footballer who played as an attacking midfielder or winger. During his career, he also played for football clubs in Turkey, England, India, South Korea, Thailand and Singapore.

== Career ==
=== Internacional ===
Moritz began his career with Avaí FC's youth categories, signing a professional contract with SC Internacional in 2003, aged 16. He was assigned to the academy and was top goal scorer in most of the Youth tournaments. He was promoted to first team in 2006, playing some matches in State League.

=== Fluminense ===
Due to limited chances, Moritz signed a contract with Fluminense. He helped the club to avoid relegation in the last game of the season, and also to win the 2007 Copa do Brasil.

=== Kasımpaşa ===
Moritz left Fluminense and moved to Europe to signed a contract with Turkish club Kasımpaşa in 2007. He scored 19 goals and contribute 3 assists in 67 appearances during his time at the club.

=== Kayserispor ===
After three full seasons in Kasımpaşa, he signed a three-year contract with Kayserispor.

=== Mersin İdman Yurdu ===
In 2011, Moritz signed a two-year contract with Mersin İdman Yurdu in the summer.

==== Trials at Rangers ====
Moritz then went on trial at Rangers in Scotland. On 15 August 2012, his trial period at Rangers came to and end. Moritz said "My time with Rangers has come to an end, I enjoyed it but it was not meant to be... Talking with English clubs..."

=== Crystal Palace ===
On 24 August 2012, Moritz signed a one-year contract with Crystal Palace playing in the 2012–13 Football League Championship. On 6 November 2012, he scored his first goal for Crystal Palace in the 5–0 victory over Ipswich Town, in Ian Holloway's first game in charge. In his next match, he scored the equaliser for Crystal Palace in a 2–1 win against Peterborough United on 10 November 2012, continuing his goalscoring run, before finding the net again on 17 November 2012 with a volley against Derby County – his third goal in three games. He then went on to score two free kicks against Wolverhampton Wanderers on 1 January 2013, receiving praise from Crystal Palace manager, Ian Holloway. Crystal Palace finished fourth in the league which sees them qualify to the 2013 Championship play-offs which the club returns back to the English Premier League after an eight-year absence by defeating Watford 1–0 in the Championship play-off final at the Wembley Stadium.

=== Bolton Wanderers ===
Moritz joined Bolton Wanderers on a one-year deal on 1 August 2013. On 9 November, Moritz scored his first goal for Bolton Wanderers against Millwall in a 3–1 victory. In July 2014, Bolton confirmed that at the expiration of his contract, Moritz had left the club.

=== Mumbai City ===
On 10 October 2014, it was announced that Moritz will play for Mumbai City in the inaugural Indian Super League. On 18 October, Moritz scored his first goal for the club en route to the league's first ever hat-trick in a 5–0 win over FC Pune City at the DY Patil Stadium.

=== Pohang Steelers ===
In September 2014, Moritz travelled to Asia to join South Korean Club, Pohang Steelers on a two-year contract which began on 1 January 2015.

=== Return to Mumbai City on loan ===
On 24 July 2015, Moritz agreed to return to Mumbai City for the 2015 season, but after only one game in October, Moritz returned to parent club Pohang Steelers.

=== Buriram United ===
On 6 December 2015, Moritz joined Buriram United in Thai Premier League for the 2016 season. On 23 February 2016, he left the club citing family reasons.

=== Denizlispor ===
On 27 July 2016, Moritz returned to Turkey after 4 years to joined Denizlispor which is playing in the 2016–17 TFF First League.

=== Return to Avaí ===
On 3 January 2018, Moritz returned to his boyhood club, Avaí to play in the Brazilian second tier, the 2018 Campeonato Brasileiro Série B. He was part of the club promotion to the first tier of Brazilian league, the 2019 Campeonato Brasileiro Série A.

=== Londrina ===
On 25 September 2019, Moritz joined Campeonato Brasileiro Série B club, Londrina.

=== Confiança ===
On 10 June 2020, Moritz joined Campeonato Brasileiro Série C club, Confiança. He helped the club to win the 2020 Campeonato Sergipano league title

=== Hougang United ===
After a year without a club, Moritz has signed up with Singaporean club, Hougang United for the 2022 Singapore Premier League season. On 11 March 2022, Moritz scored his first two goals against Geylang International. After Geylang scored in the 89' minute to equalise the game at 2–2, Moritz scored his second goal from the whistle of the kick off, with a 45-yard screamer from the half-way line to give Hougang a 3–2 victory against Geylang International. His goal was nominated for the 2022 SPL Goal of the Year. On 6 May 2022, Moritz was instrumental in the game against Lion City Sailors scoring 2 goals and providing 1 assists in the dying minutes but it wasn't enough as Hougang fell short to a 4–3 defeat. On 24 June 2022, Moritz scored secured the win for the club in the 2022 AFC Cup group stage fixtures against Cambodian side, Phnom Penh Crown in a 4–3 win. Moritz then went on to score in three consecutive games against Geylang International on 11 September 2022, Albirex Niigata Singapore on 2 October 2022 and Tampines Rovers on 8 October 2022. Moritz was then given the opportunity to lead the club as their captain during the last match of the 2022 Singapore Cup against Tampines Rovers on 6 November 2022 which he helped Hougang United en route to the final to win the cup, their first ever piece of silverware in the club history cementing his place as a club legend.

On 5 July 2023, Moritz announced his retirement from football.

== Personal life ==
Moritz has got two tattoos on his right elbow, one is dedicated to his parents and the other is an iconographic symbol of the star and crescent. Moritz learned to speak Turkish during his spells in Turkey. In 2010, he expressed that he would be delighted to play for the Turkey national team.

Moritz was also the ambassador of Crystal Palace when the club played their pre-season friendlies match in Singapore against Liverpool on 15 July 2022.

== Honours ==
Fluminense

- Copa do Brasil: 2007

Crystal Palace

- Football League Championship play-offs: 2013

Buriram United

- Toyota Premier Cup: 2016
- Kor Royal Cup: 2016

Avaí

- Campeonato Catarinense: 2019

Confiança

- Campeonato Sergipano: 2020

Hougang United

- Singapore Cup: 2022
