= Javi Lara =

Spanish footballer (born 1985)

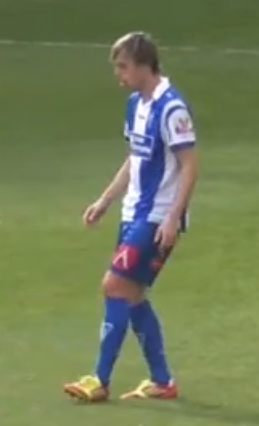
- Lara with Alcoyano in 2013

Personal information
- Full name: Javier Lara Grande
- Date of birth: 4 December 1985 (age 40)
- Place of birth: Montoro, Spain
- Height: 1.79 m (5 ft 10 1/2 in)
- Position: Midfielder

Team information
- Current team: Ibiza (sporting director)

Youth career
- Córdoba

Senior career*
Years	Team	Apps	(Gls)
2003–2007	Córdoba B	20	(5)
2006	→ Villanueva (loan)	12	(2)
2006	→ Real Unión (loan)	5	(0)
2007	→ Écija (loan)	13	(1)
2007–2008	Almería B	29	(1)
2008–2009	Alcalá	31	(0)
2009–2010	Elche	9	(0)
2010	→ Alcoyano (loan)	15	(0)
2011	Valencia B	15	(1)
2011–2012	Lucena	31	(5)
2012–2013	Alcoyano	40	(9)
2013–2014	Ponferradina	37	(4)
2014–2015	Eibar	31	(1)
2015	ATK	6	(1)
2016	Tenerife	16	(1)
2016	ATK	17	(3)
2017–2019	Córdoba	65	(3)
2019–2022	Ibiza	74	(7)
2022–2024	Alcorcón	69	(2)
2024	Linares Deportivo	15	(1)
Total		550	(47)
- * Club domestic league appearances and goals

Javier "Javi" Lara Grande (born 4 December 1985) is a Spanish former professional footballer who played as a central midfielder. He is the sporting director of Primera Federación club Ibiza.

== Club career ==
Born in Montoro, Córdoba, Lara graduated from local club Córdoba CF's youth setup, and made his senior debut with the reserves in the 2003–04 season, in the Tercera División. After Segunda División B loan stints with CD Villanueva, Real Unión and Écija Balompié, he moved to another reserve team, UD Almería B, in August 2007.

In summer 2008, Lara joined RSD Alcalá also of the fourth division. On 20 July 2009, he signed a two-year contract with Elche CF in the Segunda División. He played his first match as a professional on 3 September 2009, starting and featuring the full 90 minutes in a 3–2 away loss against FC Cartagena in the second round of the Copa del Rey. He made his league debut three days later, coming on as a second-half substitute in the 4–1 defeat at CD Numancia.

On 29 January 2010, having been sparingly used by the Andalusians, Lara was loaned to CD Alcoyano until June. He then moved to Valencia CF's B team in January 2011, following which he competed in division three with Lucena CF and Alcoyano.

On 17 July 2013, Lara signed a one-year deal with SD Ponferradina. On 24 June of the following year, he moved to SD Eibar, recently promoted to La Liga. He made his debut in the Spanish top flight on 24 August 2014, starting and scoring the game's only goal (also the club's first ever in the competition) through a free kick in a win against Real Sociedad at the Ipurua Municipal Stadium.

Lara moved abroad at the age of 29, joining ATK in the Indian Super League on 17 July 2015. He scored his first goal for the team on 13 October in their first home game of the season, a 2–1 victory over Kerala Blasters FC with Pelé in attendance at the Salt Lake Stadium.

In November 2015, after being ruled out due to injury, Lara was consequently released and replaced by his compatriot Jorge Alonso. On 2 February 2016, he returned to his home country by agreeing to a short-term deal at CD Tenerife.

On 12 August 2016, Lara returned to India and Atlético Kolkata, winning the championship after defeating Kerala Blasters in a penalty shoot-out. On 10 January 2017, he signed for Córdoba until 30 June.

Lara returned to Spain in August 2019, with the 33-year-old joining UD Ibiza for two seasons as a free agent. He was a regular starter in the side's first-ever promotion to the second division in 2021, before leaving on 18 May 2022.

On 4 July 2022, Lara signed for AD Alcorcón of Primera Federación. He contributed 41 matches and six assists in all competitions in his debut campaign, winning promotion to the second tier and subsequently renewing his contract; he scored twice from 34 appearances in 2023–24, as they went down immediately.

Lara remained in the lower leagues subsequently, his last club being Linares Deportivo in the Segunda Federación. On 21 January 2025, the 39-year-old was appointed sporting director of his former employers Ibiza.

== Career statistics ==
As of match played on 4 March 2018

Club	Season	League			Cup		Other		Total	
Club	Season	Division	Apps	Goals	Apps	Goals	Apps	Goals	Apps	Goals
Villanueva (loan)	2005–06	Segunda División B	12	2	—		—		12	2
Real Unión (loan)	2006–07	Segunda División B	5	0	2	0	—		7	0
Écija (loan)	2006–07	Segunda División B	13	1	—		—		13	1
Elche	2009–10	Segunda División	9	0	1	0	—		10	0
Alcoyano (loan)	2009–10	Segunda División B	15	0	—		2 (Note: Appearances in Segunda División B play-offs)	0	17	0
Lucena	2011–12	Segunda División B	31	5	—		4	0	35	5
Alcoyano	2012–13	Segunda División B	40	9	4	2	1	1	45	12
Ponferradina	2013–14	Segunda División	37	4	1	0	—		38	4
Eibar	2014–15	La Liga	31	1	2	0	—		33	1
ATK	2015	Indian Super League	6	1	—		—		6	1
Tenerife	2015–16	Segunda División	16	1	0	0	—		16	1
ATK	2016	Indian Super League	17	3	—		—		17	3
Córdoba	2016–17	Segunda División	21	1	0	0	—		21	1
Córdoba	2017–18	Segunda División	24	0	0	0	—		24	0
Córdoba	Total		45	1	0	0	—		45	1
Career total			277	28	10	2	7	1	294	31

== Honours ==
ATK

- Indian Super League: 2016
