= Juan Aguilera (Spanish footballer) =

Spanish footballer

Personal information
- Full name: Juan Aguilera Núñez
- Date of birth: 13 September 1985 (age 41)
- Place of birth: Madrid, Spain
- Height: 1.85 m (6 ft 1 in)
- Position: Midfielder

Youth career
- Real Madrid
- Getafe

Senior career*
Years	Team	Apps	(Gls)
2003–2004	Getafe B	15	(0)
2004–2005	Navalcarnero	30	(0)
2005–2008	Leganés	96	(2)
2008–2010	Murcia B	44	(5)
2010–2012	Murcia	51	(1)
2012–2015	Platanias	82	(2)
2015	Mumbai City	9	(1)
2016–2019	Huesca	83	(3)
2019–2022	Alcorcón	46	(0)
Total		456	(14)
- * Club domestic league appearances and goals

Juan Aguilera Núñez (born 13 September 1985) is a Spanish former professional footballer who played as a central midfielder.

== Club career ==
Born in Madrid, Aguilera began his career with amateurs Getafe CF B and CDA Navalcarnero, then played three years in the Segunda División B for another club in the Community of Madrid, CD Leganés. In 2008 he was transferred to Real Murcia CF, being assigned to the B team also at that level.

Aguilera made his debut with the first team on 9 January 2010, coming on as a second-half substitute in a 0–2 home loss against Elche CF. He appeared in a further three games for them during the season, as both the first and the second sides eventually suffered relegation.

Aguilera was first choice for Murcia in the 2010–11 campaign, in an immediate promotion. On 13 July 2015, after three years in the Super League Greece with Platanias FC, he signed for Indian Super League club Mumbai City FC.

On 23 February 2016, Aguilera returned to Spain and its division two after agreeing to a short-term deal with SD Huesca. He was a regular starter during 2017–18, as they achieved a first-ever promotion to La Liga.

Aguilera made his debut in the Spanish top tier at the age of 32 years and 11 months on 25 September 2018, replacing Cucho Hernández in a 3–0 defeat away to Atlético Madrid. On 3 July 2019, after suffering relegation, he signed a three-year contract with AD Alcorcón of the second division; he left in January 2022 as a free agent.

== Career statistics ==
As of match played on 2 June 2018

Club	Season	League			Cup		Continental		Total	
Club	Season	Division	Apps	Goals	Apps	Goals	Apps	Goals	Apps	Goals
Navalcarnero	2004–05	Segunda División B	30	0	0	0	—		30	0
Leganés	2005–06	Segunda División B	30	0	2	0	—		32	0
Leganés	2006–07	Segunda División B	36	2	0	0	—		36	2
Leganés	2007–08	Segunda División B	30	0	0	0	—		30	0
Leganés	Total		96	2	2	0	—		98	2
Murcia	2008–09	Segunda División	0	0	0	0	—		0	0
Murcia	2009–10	Segunda División	4	0	0	0	—		4	0
Murcia	2010–11	Segunda División B	30	1	1	0	2 (Note: Appearances in Segunda División B play-offs)	0	33	1
Murcia	2011–12	Segunda División	17	0	1	0	—		18	0
Murcia	Total		51	1	2	0	2	0	55	1
Platanias	2012–13	Super League Greece	24	0	4	0	—		28	0
Platanias	2013–14	Super League Greece	32	0	1	0	—		33	0
Platanias	2014–15	Super League Greece	26	2	2	0	—		28	2
Platanias	Total		82	2	7	0	—		89	2
Mumbai City	2015	Indian Super League	9	1	—		—		9	1
Huesca	2015–16	Segunda División	10	0	0	0	—		10	0
Huesca	2016–17	Segunda División	32	2	1	1	2 (Note: Appearances in La Liga play-offs)	0	35	3
Huesca	2017–18	Segunda División	35	1	0	0	—		35	1
Huesca	Total		77	3	1	1	2	0	80	4
Career total			345	9	12	1	4	0	361	10
