= Rowilson Rodrigues =

Indian footballer (born 1987)

Personal information
- Full name: Rowilson Rodrigues
- Date of birth: 26 March 1987 (age 39)
- Place of birth: Majorda, Goa, India
- Height: 1.81 m (5 ft 11 1/2 in)
- Position: Centre back

Youth career
- 2005–2006: SESA FA

Senior career*
Years	Team	Apps	(Gls)
2006–2011	Churchill Brothers		
2011–2013	Dempo	24	(1)
2013–2014	Mohun Bagan	10	(0)
2014–2017	Dempo	19	(0)
2014	→FC Goa (loan)	1	(0)
2015	→Mumbai City FC (loan)	4	(0)
2017	Churchill Brothers	14	(0)
2017–2018	Delhi Dynamos	8	(0)
2018–2020	Churchill Brothers	3	(0)
2020–2021	Gokulam Kerala FC		

International career
2010–2011	India U23	7	(0)
2011–	India	1	(0)
- * Club domestic league appearances and goals as of 20:13, 11 January 2019 (UTC)

Rowilson Rodrigues (born 26 March 1987) is an Indian football player who plays as a centre back for Gokulam Kerala FC in the I-League.

== Career ==
Rodrigues started his footballing career at SESA FA before joining Goan club Churchill Brothers and played with them for the I-League 2010-11 season but in June 2011 he moved from Churchill to local rivals Dempo After a 2-year stint with Dempo, he moved to century-old Kolkata-based club Mohun Bagan in 2013. In May 2014 Rodrigues rejoined Dempo after a difficult season with Mohun Bagan.

== International ==
He was called up for India U-23's for the 2010 Asian Games, during which he was a regular starter throughout the tournament and helped the team reach the pre-quarter finals, where India lost to Japan. Following a good season, he was called up for the India national football team preparatory camp in June 2011.

== Honours ==
India U23

- SAFF Championship: 2009
