= Darren O'Dea =

Irish footballer (born 1987)

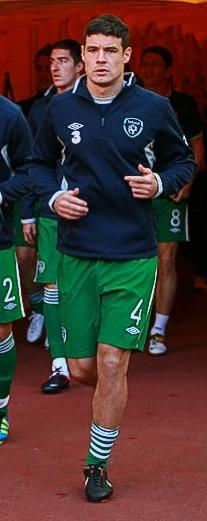
- O'Dea playing for Ireland in 2011

Personal information
- Full name: Darren O'Dea
- Date of birth: 4 February 1987 (age 39)
- Place of birth: Dublin, Ireland
- Height: 6 ft 1 in (1.85 m)
- Position: Defender

Team information
- Current team: Slovan Bratislava (assistant coach)

Youth career
- Home Farm
- 2005–2006: Celtic

Senior career*
Years	Team	Apps	(Gls)
2006–2012	Celtic	49	(4)
2009	→ Reading (loan)	8	(0)
2010–2011	→ Ipswich Town (loan)	20	(0)
2011–2012	→ Leeds United (loan)	35	(2)
2012–2013	Toronto FC	26	(1)
2013–2014	Metalurh Donetsk	16	(2)
2014–2015	Blackpool	19	(0)
2015	Mumbai City FC	9	(0)
2016–2019	Dundee	88	(4)
2019	East Kilbride	0	(0)
Total		270	(13)

International career
- Republic of Ireland U19
2007–2008	Republic of Ireland U21	10	(1)
2009–2013	Republic of Ireland	20	(1)

Managerial career
- 2021–2025: Celtic B
- 2025: Swansea City (caretaker)
- * Club domestic league appearances and goals as of 19:39, 18 June 2019 (UTC)

Darren O'Dea (born 4 February 1987) is an Irish professional football coach and former player who is assistant coach of Slovak First Football League club Slovan Bratislava. He played as a centre back for clubs in Scotland, England, Canada, Ukraine and India, and represented the Republic of Ireland internationally.

O'Dea began his career at the youth team of Celtic, with whom he played from 2006 to 2012. During his time at Celtic, he was loaned to Reading, Ipswich Town and Leeds United. While playing for Leeds, O'Dea won the Ireland Young International Player of the Year Award. For more first-team opportunities he switched clubs and countries, joining Toronto FC of Major League Soccer for a year until 2013.

The following season, he represented Metalurh Donetsk in Ukraine. O'Dea's stint was cut short due to the Ukrainian political situation, and he returned to England with Blackpool. In July 2015, he signed with Indian Super League club Mumbai City FC. After three years with Dundee, O'Dea retired from playing professionally in 2019. He then became a coach at Motherwell, while playing semi-professionally for East Kilbride.

After being capped by the youth national teams of the Republic of Ireland, O'Dea made his senior-team debut in 2009 and was capped 20 times up to 2013. He represented Ireland at the 2012 UEFA European Championship.

== Club career ==
=== Celtic ===
Born in Dublin, O'Dea played for Home Farm before he was signed by Celtic as a teenager. After making his way through the reserves and academy side, he made his first-team debut for Celtic in the Scottish League Cup against St Mirren in September 2006. A month later, O'Dea made his league debut against Inverness Caledonian Thistle, where he played the last thirty minutes after substituting for Gary Caldwell. His UEFA Champions League debut was on 6 December against Danish club F.C. Copenhagen as a substitute for the injured Stephen McManus. O'Dea made his first league starting appearance against Dunfermline Athletic four days after his Champions League debut. Later that month he scored his first goal in a match against Dundee United, with his rebound of a 78th-minute free kick by Shunsuke Nakamura tying the match 2–2. O'Dea's first season saw him also score against Livingston in the run to the 2006–07 Scottish Cup.

After playing 16 times for Celtic, O'Dea signed a three-year contract in March 2007 and considered it a "reward for the hard work" he had done. In his second season he contributed to Celtic winning the league championship, although he did not feature in the title winning match against Dundee United. After O'Dea did not play for two months (since his last Champions League match against FC Spartak Moscow), the BBC reported in October that he would be recalled to the injury-plagued team as a replacement for Gary Caldwell, and he played the entire league match against Rangers on 20 October 2007. That season, he primarily played centre-back.

During the 2008–09 season O'Dea made a total of sixteen appearances, scoring twice. His extra-time goal in the 2009 Scottish League Cup Final gave Celtic the trophy. After playing fifty times for the club, O'Dea was loaned to championship club Reading in September 2009 for more first-team experience and he called it a "massive chance" to represent Celtic. He made his debut in a 0–0 draw against Doncaster Rovers, with his second-half shot saved by Doncaster goalkeeper Neil Sullivan. In a September interview, O'Dea was reluctant to return to Celtic for rare match opportunities.

Returning from Reading in January 2010, he started all five games that month. O'Dea was appointed stand-in captain after Stephen McManus went on loan to Middlesbrough and Gary Caldwell left for Wigan. At the start of the following season, again finding himself superfluous at Celtic, he was loaned to Ipswich Town on 18 August 2010 until January 2011 and made his Ipswich debut against Crystal Palace on 21 August. In January O'Dea said he was uncertain if his loan would be extended because of the sacking of Ipswich manager Roy Keane, expressing his desire to stay. New manager Paul Jewell unexpectedly extended his loan to the end of the season. Vital Football praised O'Dea's performance in a league cup match against Arsenal, with Jewell calling it "tremendous and crucial in the result". Two months later, he expressed a desire to return to Celtic instead of signing permanently with Ipswich. O'Dea said he would play for another club if he did not have first-team opportunities at Celtic, since he felt that playing was "not about sitting on a bench".

In May 2011, he said he "may quit Celtic" to play regularly and represent the national team at the 2012 UEFA Euro qualifiers. The following month Leeds United signed him on loan until the end of the season, and he said his objective on his new club was to win promotion to Premier League. O'Dea made his Leeds debut in a 3–1 loss to Southampton. He scored his first goal for the club against Coventry City, an "angled shot" for a 1–1 draw. O'Dea again found the net in the next game, against Peterborough United, in the 95th minute for a 3–2 win. Against Cardiff City, according to the BBC Leeds conceded a goal due to O'Dea's "indecision" which "opened the door for Joe Mason". In a January 2012 interview he expressed his desire to sign permanently with Leeds, although he received a red card in a loss to Blackpool. O'Dea played 38 times for Leeds, scoring twice. Due to his form with Leeds and Ireland, O'Dea and teammate Aidy White were nominated for the Young International Player of the Year at the Football Association of Ireland International Football Awards. He won the award in a ceremony held in February 2012.

After spending the previous two seasons out on loan, O'Dea was released by Celtic at the end of his contract on 1 June 2012 despite a one-year contract-extension option. He said he "had a great time at Celtic and have a lot of friends there so it was important for me that I left properly".

=== Toronto FC ===
O'Dea signed with Major League Soccer club Toronto FC on 3 August 2012, and made his club debut on 18 August in a 1–0 home loss to Sporting Kansas City. According to CBC News, he looked "lively" in his first match with the team. In a match against Houston Dynamo he passed to Terry Dunfield, who scored, and at the end of the game said he was "delighted" with the result. Manager Paul Mariner named O'Dea team captain in September, succeeding the injured Torsten Frings. The following month, he was unable to play a match against Montreal Impact due to a thigh injury sustained during World Cup qualifying play for Ireland. In O'Dea's first season for Toronto, he played nine times as Toronto finished tenth in the Eastern Conference. O'Dea was employed at left back for the 2013 season after the regular player at that position was injured. According to him, it had been two years since he had previously played left back. O'Dea scored his first goal for Toronto on 3 July 2013 in a 3–3 home draw with Canadian rivals Montreal Impact. Because of his "keen sense of positioning and timing" against Sporting Kansas City, he was named to the Team of the Week for 12 March. Originally part of a transfer (a "win-win for both parties", according to head coach Ryan Nelsen, since O'Dea was the highest-paid player in the league), he was released by Toronto on 18 July 2013 to sign with FC Metalurh Donetsk. Club president Kevin Payne wished him luck and hoped he would return in the future. O'Dea played a total of 26 times for Toronto, scoring one goal and setting up three, and was succeeded as team captain by Steven Caldwell.

=== Metalurh Donetsk ===
After his release from Toronto O'Dea signed a three-year contract with Ukraine's FC Metalurh Donetsk. He debuted for the team in a 20 July 2013 1–1 draw with FC Karpaty Lviv, playing 46 minutes before being substituted. O'Dea scored his first goal for Metalurh in his second game, a 2–1 away win over Vorskla Poltava. He left the club in August 2014, terminating his contract two years early due to the unrest in Ukraine. O'Dea described the situation in the country as "hostile and intense, but also surreal".

=== Blackpool ===
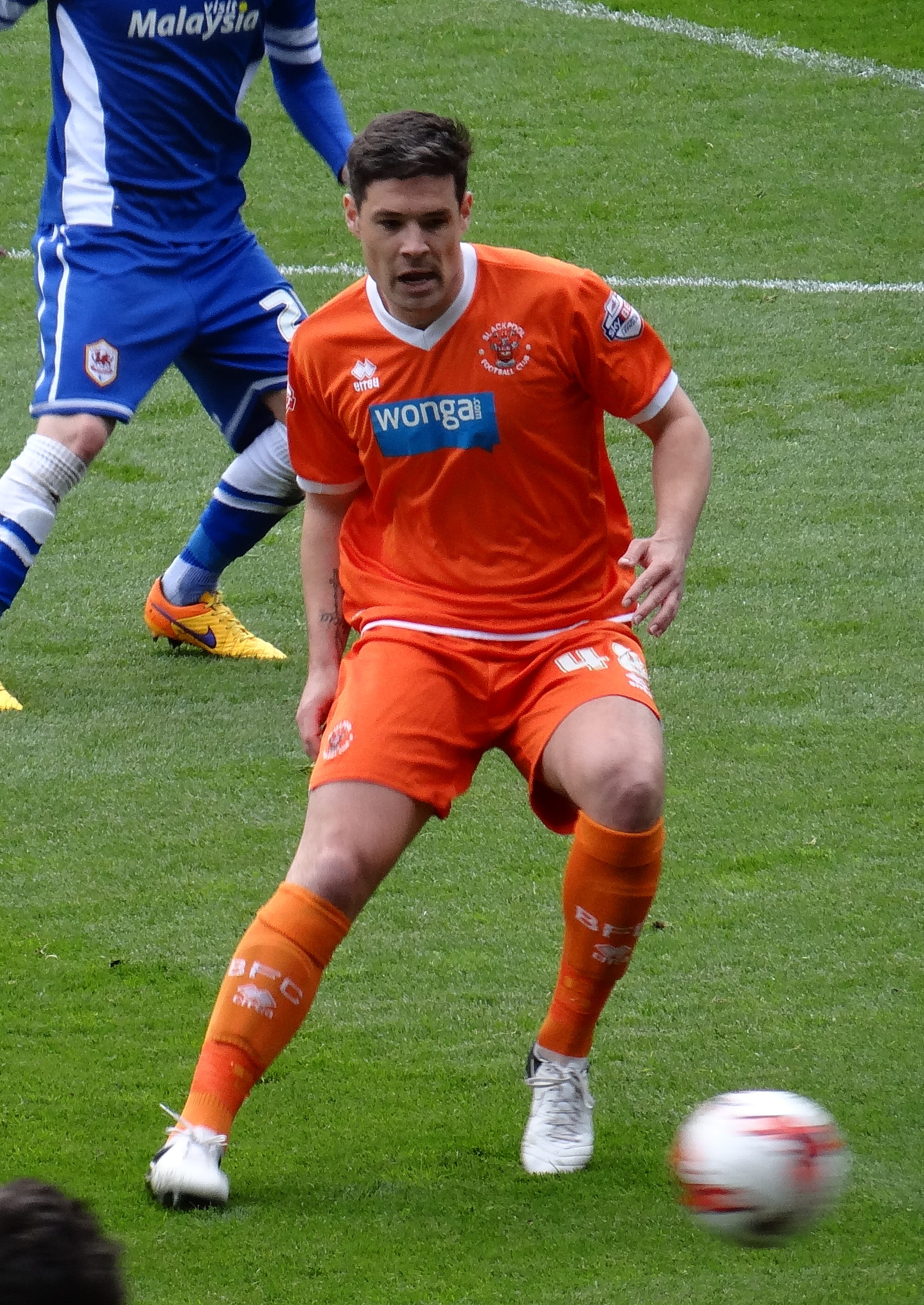
O'Dea playing for Blackpool in 2015.

O'Dea then signed with championship club Blackpool in December 2014, making his debut in a 6–1 loss to Bournemouth. Bournemouth's fourth goal was scored by Brett Pitman, converting a penalty shot incurred by O'Dea (who fouled Callum Wilson in the penalty area). Against Wolverhampton Wanderers, the BBC reported that he "got into a terrible muddle trying to cut out a pass from Kevin McDonald" and allowed Benik Afobe (in his first game for Wolverhampton) to score the second goal. O'Dea was injured in a match against Nottingham Forest in February 2015, forcing him to miss the game with Blackburn Rovers. Released when his contract expired in May, he said the club had a "disastrous season". O'Dea played 20 times for Blackpool.

=== Mumbai City ===
Although the Toronto Sun reported in May 2015 that O'Dea might re-sign with the city's MLS club, he signed a contract until 22 December with Indian Super League club Mumbai City FC, managed by Nicolas Anelka. Calling his signing "a new experience, a new chapter", he said he knew little about the quality of football in the league. O'Dea made his ISL debut on 10 October, starting in a goalless draw at Kerala Blasters. He left the club after making nine appearances.

=== Dundee ===
O'Dea signed a short-term contract with Dundee in January 2016. On 22 March 2016, he signed a new three-year contract. In June 2017, O'Dea was named as permanent club captain by Dundee, having performed the role during the previous season in place of the injured James McPake.

On 7 May 2019, O'Dea announced in a long-form announcement on his Twitter account that he would be leaving Dundee at the end of the season, and that this would mark the conclusion of his last season as a full-time professional footballer.

=== East Kilbride ===
O'Dea signed for his local side East Kilbride in May 2019 but left in August without making a single Lowland League appearance for the club. O'Dea left to focus on his coaching commitments with Motherwell full time.

== International career ==
After playing for the Irish under-19 and under-21 teams, O'Dea was called up to the international squad within a year. Promoted to the Irish under-21 international squad by manager Don Givens on 3 March 2007, he was the team captain. Less than a week later, O'Dea was named to the international squad for Ireland's UEFA Euro 2008 qualifying Group D matches on 24 and 28 March.

On 13 May 2008, he was listed on Giovanni Trapattoni's first squad as Ireland's manager for the 2010 FIFA World Cup qualification – UEFA Group 8 matches against Bulgaria and Italy. O'Dea made his senior-team debut on 8 September 2009 in a 1–0 friendly win over South Africa at Thomond Park in Limerick as a 60th-minute substitute for Paul McShane.

After a match against the Czech Republic, O'Dea said he dreamed of being named to the Irish squad for UEFA Euro 2012. Although he was on the roster for the tournament in Poland and Ukraine, he did not appear; the Irish were eliminated from the group stage. O'Dea scored his first senior goal for Ireland, an 88th-minute header, in a World Cup qualifying match against the Faroe Islands on 16 October 2012 which Ireland won 4–1.

== Playing style ==
O'Dea's manager at Toronto FC, Paul Mariner, described him as a "different specimen" with "fantastic habits" and a good leader. According to Miloš Kocić, he is a good defender of set pieces.

== Coaching career ==
O'Dea was appointed to a coaching position with Motherwell in May 2019. In September 2019 he left Motherwell and returned to Celtic to become manager of their under-18s. In October 2021 he was promoted to coach Celtic's B team and later became head coach in June 2022. In April 2024, Celtic announced a new role for O'Dea as the professional player pathway manager for the club with the aim of developing and progressing academy players into the first team.

In June 2025, O'Dea joined Swansea City as assistant to compatriot Alan Sheehan. On 22 November, between Sheehan's dismissal and the appointment of Vítor Matos, O'Dea was caretaker manager as Swansea lost 3–0 away to Bristol City in the EFL Championship.

== Career statistics ==
Appearances and goals by club, season and competition
Club	Season	League			National Cup		League Cup		Continental (Note: Appearances in UEFA Champions League, CONCACAF Champions League and UEFA Europa League)		Total	
Club	Season	Division	Apps	Goals	Apps	Goals	Apps	Goals	Apps	Goals	Apps	Goals
Celtic	2006–07	Scottish Premier League	14	2	3	1	1	0	3	0	21	3
Celtic	2007–08	Scottish Premier League	6	0	2	0	0	0	2	0	10	0
Celtic	2008–09	Scottish Premier League	10	1	2	0	2	1	2	0	16	2
Celtic	2009–10	Scottish Premier League	19	1	3	0	0	0	1	0	23	1
Celtic	Total		49	4	10	1	3	1	8	0	70	6
Reading (loan)	2009–10	Championship	8	0	0	0	0	0	—		8	0
Ipswich Town (loan)	2010–11	Championship	20	0	1	0	4	0	—		25	0
Leeds United (loan)	2011–12	Championship	35	2	1	0	2	0	—		38	2
Toronto FC	2012	Major League Soccer	9	0	0	0	—		1	0	10	0
Toronto FC	2013	Major League Soccer	17	1	0	0	—		—		17	1
Toronto FC	Total		26	1	0	0	—		1	0	27	1
Metalurh Donetsk	2013–14	Ukrainian Premier League	16	2	1	0	—		1	0	18	2
Blackpool	2014–15	Championship	19	0	1	0	0	0	—		20	0
Mumbai City FC	2015	Indian Super League	9	0	—		—		—		9	0
Dundee	2015–16	Scottish Premiership	16	0	3	0	0	0	—		19	0
Dundee	2016–17	Scottish Premiership	35	4	0	0	4	1	—		39	5
Dundee	2017–18	Scottish Premiership	16	0	2	0	4	0	–		22	0
Dundee	2018–19	Scottish Premiership	21	0	1	0	0	0	–		22	0
Dundee	Total		88	4	6	0	8	1	0	0	102	5
Career total			270	13	20	1	17	2	10	0	317	16

== Managerial statistics ==
Managerial record by team and tenure
Team	From	To	Record				
Team	From	To	P^{1}	W	D	L	Win %
Swansea City	21 November 2025	24 November 2025	1	0	0	1	0.00

== Honours ==
=== Club ===
Celtic

- Scottish Premier League: 2006–07, 2007–08
- Scottish League Cup: 2008–09
- Scottish Cup: 2006–07

International

- Nations Cup: 2011

=== Individual ===
- Ireland Young International Player of the Year Award 2012
