= Cristian Bustos =

Spanish footballer (born 1983)

Personal information
- Full name: Cristian Bustos Costa
- Date of birth: 29 May 1983 (age 43)
- Place of birth: Petrer, Spain
- Height: 1.77 m (5 ft 10 in)
- Position: Defensive midfielder

Youth career
- Petrelense
- Eldense
- Villarreal

Senior career*
Years	Team	Apps	(Gls)
2001–2002	Eldense		
2002–2003	Pinoso		
2003–2004	Murcia B		
2004–2005	Hércules B		
2004–2005	Hércules	6	(0)
2005–2007	Valencia B	34	(1)
2007–2009	Salamanca	56	(0)
2009–2014	Celta	97	(0)
2013–2014	→ Sporting Gijón (loan)	32	(0)
2014–2015	Mallorca	31	(1)
2015	Mumbai City	12	(0)
2016–2018	Lorca	53	(1)
2018	UCAM Murcia	15	(0)
Total		336	(3)

Managerial career
- 2018–2019: Numancia (assistant)
- 2019: Tenerife (assistant)
- 2020: Albacete (assistant)
- * Club domestic league appearances and goals

Cristian Bustos Costa (born 29 May 1983) is a Spanish former footballer who played as a defensive midfielder.

Having reached the professionals at the age of 24, he went on to amass Segunda División totals of 226 games and one goal, mainly at the service of Celta. He also competed in La Liga with that club in the 2012–13 season.

== Playing career ==
=== Early years and Celta ===
Bustos was born in Petrer, Province of Alicante, Valencian Community. He began his senior career in the lower leagues, with CD Eldense, Pinoso CF, Real Murcia B, Hércules CF B, Hércules CF and Valencia CF Mestalla. In 2007, he signed for UD Salamanca, playing his first match as a professional on 26 August 2007 as he started in a 3–0 away loss against Málaga CF in the Segunda División, and went on to make 58 appearances in all competitions over two seasons before transferring to another club in that league, RC Celta de Vigo, on a four-year deal.

Bustos won promotion to La Liga with Celta in 2012, as runners-up. He made his debut in the competition on 18 August of that year, playing 79 minutes in a 0–1 home defeat to Málaga, and scored his only official goal for the side on 12 December, in a 2–1 win over Real Madrid at the Balaídos in the round of 16 of the Copa del Rey.

In January 2013, rumours arose of Bustos joining Sporting de Gijón, as a result of which he was left out of the squad to face Real Madrid in the second leg. The next day, he was loaned out to the club until June, and subsequently the agreement was extended for a further season.

=== Mallorca ===
Bustos' contract with Celta was terminated by mutual consent on 30 June 2014, and the following month he signed for RCD Mallorca of the second tier. He scored his first goal for his new team on 3 January 2015, in the 46th minute of a 2–0 home victory over Albacete Balompié.

=== Mumbai City ===
On 30 July 2015, Bustos moved to Indian Super League franchise Mumbai City FC; upon joining, the 32-year-old said that he was "excited for the opportunity to play outside Spain". He made his debut on 10 October, playing the full 90 minutes in a 0–0 away draw with Kerala Blasters FC.

=== Later career ===
Bustos retired in 2018 at the age of 35, following spells with Lorca FC and UCAM Murcia CF. In the 2016–17 campaign, the veteran contributed 40 games (playoffs included) as the former reached the second division for the first time ever.

== Coaching career ==
Subsequently, Bustos had assistant coach spells at several second-tier clubs under Aritz López Garai.

== Career statistics ==
Club	Season	League			Cup		Other		Total	
Club	Season	Division	Apps	Goals	Apps	Goals	Apps	Goals	Apps	Goals
Hércules	2004–05	Segunda División B	6	0	0	0	—		6	0
Valencia B	2006–07	Segunda División B	34	1	—		2 (Note: Appearances in Segunda División B play-offs)	0	36	1
Salamanca	2007–08	Segunda División	25	0	0	0	—		25	0
Salamanca	2008–09	Segunda División	31	0	2	0	—		33	0
Salamanca	Total		56	0	2	0	—		58	0
Celta	2009–10	Segunda División	28	0	5	0	—		33	0
Celta	2010–11	Segunda División	38	0	1	0	2 (Note: Appearances in La Liga play-offs)	0	41	0
Celta	2011–12	Segunda División	24	0	2	0	—		26	0
Celta	2012–13	La Liga	7	0	2	1	—		9	1
Celta	Total		97	0	10	1	2	0	109	1
Sporting Gijón (loan)	2012–13	Segunda División	16	0	0	0	—		16	0
Sporting Gijón (loan)	2013–14	Segunda División	16	0	0	0	1	0	17	0
Sporting Gijón (loan)	Total		32	0	0	0	1	0	33	0
Mallorca	2014–15	Segunda División	31	1	0	0	—		31	1
Mumbai City	2015	Indian Super League	12	0	—		—		12	0
Lorca	2016–17	Segunda División B	36	1	0	0	4	0	40	1
Lorca	2017–18	Segunda División	17	0	0	0	—		17	0
Lorca	Total		53	1	0	0	4	0	57	1
UCAM Murcia	2017–18	Segunda División B	15	0	0	0	—		15	0
Career total			336	3	12	1	9	0	357	4
