= Pavel Čmovš =

Czech footballer (born 1990)

Personal information
- Date of birth: 29 June 1990 (age 36)
- Place of birth: Plzeň, Czechoslovakia
- Position: Defender

Team information
- Current team: Benešov

Youth career
- Slavia Prague

Senior career*
Years	Team	Apps	(Gls)
2010–2014	NEC	51	(1)
2010–2011	→ Veendam (loan)	33	(2)
2014	Levski Sofia	8	(0)
2014	Mumbai City	13	(0)
2015	Rapid București	17	(0)
2015–2016	Mumbai City	11	(0)
2016–2018	Mladá Boleslav	24	(1)
2018–2020	Teplice	47	(0)
2020–2021	Nea Salamina	16	(0)
2021	Pohronie	12	(0)
2022	Academica Clinceni	8	(0)
2022	PAEEK	12	(1)
2023	Amaliendorf	12	(0)
2023–	Benešov	15	(0)

International career^{‡}
2006	Czech Republic U17	3	(0)
2007–2008	Czech Republic U18	5	(0)
2008–2009	Czech Republic U19	6	(0)
2011	Czech Republic U20	1	(0)
2011–2012	Czech Republic U21	10	(0)
- * Club domestic league appearances and goals as of 21:41, 9 January 2024 (UTC) ‡ National team caps and goals as of 27 January 2014

Pavel Čmovš (born 29 June 1990) is a Czech professional footballer who plays as a defender for Benešov.

== Club career ==
Born in Plzeň, Čmovš has played for Slavia Prague, NEC, Veendam and Levski Sofia.

In July 2015 he returned to Indian club Mumbai City.

In July 2021, Čmovš signed with Pohronie. He made his Fortuna Liga debut on 25 July 2021 at Štadión Antona Malatinského against Spartak Trnava, in an opening game of the 2021–22 season. Pohronie lost 0–2 following a first-half goal from Roman Procházka and a second-half goal from Dejan Trajkovski. He was released during the 2021 winter break. He then signed for Academica Clinceni in January 2022, and PAEEK in August 2022.

== International career ==
He has played youth international football for the Czech Republic.
