= Frantz Bertin =

Haitian footballer (born 1983)

Personal information
- Full name: Frantz Bertin
- Date of birth: 30 May 1983 (age 43)
- Place of birth: Paris, France
- Height: 1.82 m (6 ft 0 in)
- Position: Centre back

Youth career
- Red Star
- 2002–2003: Juventus

Senior career*
Years	Team	Apps	(Gls)
2003–2005	Racing B	39	(2)
2005	Racing Santander	15	(0)
2005–2006	Tenerife	18	(0)
2007	Atlético Madrid B	17	(3)
2007–2008	Benidorm	19	(0)
2008	Luzern	5	(0)
2009–2011	OFI	73	(0)
2011–2012	Alki Larnaca	4	(0)
2012–2013	Veria	7	(0)
2013–2014	Panachaiki	11	(0)
2014–2015	Apollon Kalamarias	11	(2)
2015	Aiginiakos	12	(0)
2015	Mumbai City	11	(1)
Total		242	(8)

International career
2007–2016	Haiti	41	(1)
- * Club domestic league appearances and goals

Frantz Bertin (born 30 May 1983) is a Haitian former professional footballer who played as a central defender.

== Club career ==
Bertin was born in Paris, France. After beginning his career with Red Star, he finished his formation in Italy with Juventus.

In 2003, Bertin moved teams and countries again, signing for Racing de Santander in Spain. During his two-year stint with the Cantabrian club, he played mainly with the reserves, but still contributed with 15 games (13 starts) in the 2004–05 season as the team narrowly avoided La Liga relegation.

Bertin continued playing in the country in the following years, with CD Tenerife in the second division and Atlético Madrid B and Benidorm CF in the third. In the 2008 summer he joined FC Luzern in the Swiss Super League, but left in the following transfer window, signing with OFI in Greece.

Shortly before the end of the January transfer deadline, after an unassuming spell in Cyprus, Bertin returned to Greece, joining Veria F.C. until the end of the season. He made his Super League debut on 23 February, in a 2–0 away win against Skoda Xanthi.

== International career ==
Bertin represented Haiti at the 2007 CONCACAF Gold Cup in the United States, and made his debut in the nation's final group stage game, a 0–2 loss against Canada. In February 2008 he played in a friendly with Venezuela, serving as warm-up for the 2010 FIFA World Cup qualifiers against the Netherlands Antilles, which ended with a 1–0 aggregate win – he appeared in the second leg, a 1–0 success in Willemstad – with Haiti thus progressing to the third round.

=== International goals ===
As of 20 August 2008 (Haiti score listed first, score column indicates score after each Bertin goal)

No	Date	Venue	Opponent	Score	Result	Competition
1.	20 August 2008	Sylvio Cator, Port-au-Prince, Haiti	Suriname	1–2	2–2	2010 World Cup qualification
