= List of foreign Indian Super League players =

This is a list of foreign players in the Indian Super League, which commenced play in 2014. The following players must meet both of the following criteria:

1. Have played in at least one Indian Super League game (including finals). Players who were signed by Indian Super League clubs, but only played in cup and/or continental games, or did not play in any competitive games at all, are not included.
2. Are considered foreign, i.e., outside India determined by the following:

A player is considered foreign if he is not eligible to play for the national team of India.

More specifically,

- If a player has been capped on international level, the national team is used; if he has been capped by more than one country, the highest level (or the most recent) team is used.
- If a player has not been capped on international level, his country of birth is used.

As of now, 94 FIFA-affiliated nations have been represented in the Indian Super League. Central African Republic and Uzbekistan are the most recent to be represented with Lobi Manzoki and Mirjalol Kasimov debuting for Mohammedan on 16 September 2024.

In bold: players who currently plays in the Indian Super League.

Details correct as of 3 February 2026

== Africa (CAF) ==
=== Botswana ===
- Ofentse Nato – ATK – 2014–16

=== Burkina Faso ===
- Bakary Koné – Kerala Blasters – 2020–21
- Saidou Panandetiguiri – Pune City – 2014

=== Cameroon ===
- Achille Emaná – Mumbai City – 2017–18
- André Bikey – NorthEast United, Pune City, Jamshedpur, ATK – 2015–19
- Eric Djemba-Djemba – Chennaiyin – 2014
- **Raphaël Messi Bouli** – Kerala Blasters, East Bengal, **Jamshedpur** – 2019–20, 2024–
- Yaya Banana – Bengaluru – 2021–22

=== Cape Verde ===
- Odair Fortes – NorthEast United – 2017–18
- Valdo – ATK – 2015

=== Central African Republic ===
- **Lobi Manzoki** – **Mohammedan** – 2024–

=== Chad ===
- Azrack Mahamat – Kerala Blasters – 2016

=== Congo (Republic of the Congo) ===
- Prince Ibara – Bengaluru – 2021–2023

=== Democratic Republic of Congo (Democratic Republic of the Congo) ===
- Arnold Issoko – Mumbai City – 2018–19
- Jacques Maghoma – East Bengal – 2020–21
- Kule Mbombo – NorthEast United – 2023

=== Equatorial Guinea ===
- Eduardo Ferreira – Pune City – 2016
- Iván Bolado – Pune City – 2014

=== Ethiopia ===
- Fikru Teferra – ATK, Chennaiyin – 2014–15

=== Gabon ===
- Sèrge Kevyn – Mumbai City – 2019–20
- Yrondu Musavu-King – Bengaluru – 2021–22

=== Ghana ===
- Asamoah Gyan – NorthEast United – 2019–20
- Augustine Okrah – NorthEast United – 2018–19
- Courage Pekuson – Kerala Blasters – 2017–19
- David Addy – Delhi Dynamos – 2016
- Francis Dadzie – NorthEast United – 2015
- **Joseph Adjei** – **Mohammedan** – 2024–
- Kwame Karikari – Chennaiyin – 2022–2023
- **Kwame Peprah** – **Kerala Blasters** – 2023–
- Kwesi Appiah – NorthEast United – 2020–21
- **Mohammed Kadiri** – **Mohammedan** – 2024–
- Richard Gadze – Delhi Dynamos – 2015–16

=== Guinea ===
- Florentin Pogba – Mohun Bagan SG – 2022
- Idrissa Sylla – NorthEast United – 2020–21

=== Guinea Bissau (Guinea-Bissau) ===
- **Edmilson Correia** – **Hyderabad** – 2024–
- Esmaël Gonçalves – Chennaiyin – 2020–21
- Sambinha – NorthEast United – 2017–18
- Steve Ambri – Jamshedpur – 2023

=== Ivory Coast ===
- Didier Kadio – Kerala Blasters – 2016
- Didier Zokora – Pune City, NorthEast United – 2015–16
- Romaric – NorthEast United – 2016

=== Mali ===
- Dramane Traoré – Pune City – 2016
- Mohamed Sissoko – Pune City – 2016

=== Mauritania ===
- Khassa Camara – NorthEast United, Hyderabad – 2020–22

=== Morocco ===
- **Ahmed Jahouh** – Goa, Mumbai City, **Odisha** – 2017–
- **Alaaeddine Ajaraie** – **NorthEast United** – 2024–
- **Hamza Regragui** – **NorthEast United** – 2024–
- **Mohammed Ali Bemammer** – **NorthEast United** – 2023–
- **Noah Sadaoui** – Goa, **Kerala Blasters** – 2022–
- Noussair El Maimouni – ATK – 2018–19
- Zaid Krouch – Goa – 2018-2019

=== Nigeria ===
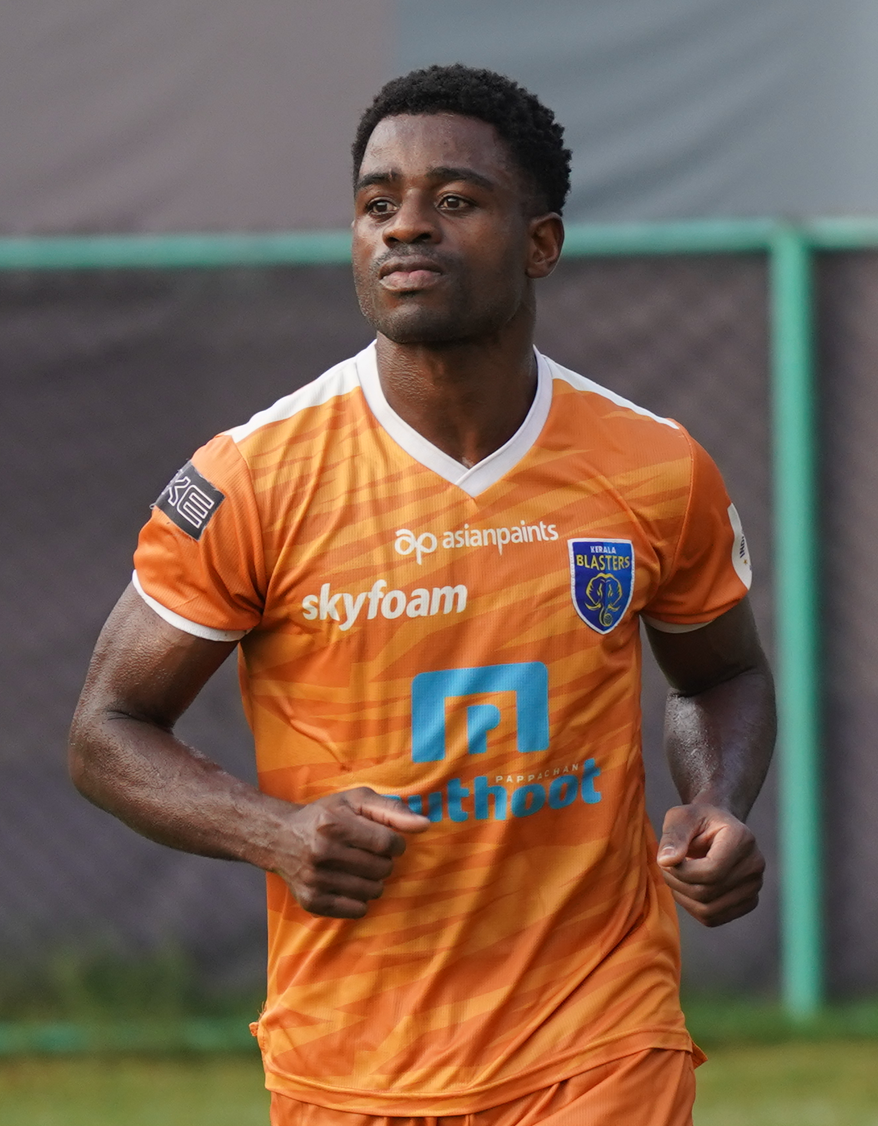
Bartholomew Ogbeche is the 2nd highest goal scorer in Indian Super League history with 63 goals.

- Bartholomew Ogbeche – NorthEast United, Kerala Blasters, Mumbai City, Hyderabad – 2018–23
- Bright Enobakhare – East Bengal – 2021
- **Daniel Chima** – East Bengal, Jamshedpur, **Chennaiyin** – 2021–
- Dudu Omagbemi – Pune City, FC Goa, Chennaiyin – 2014–16
- Izu Azuka – Jamshedpur – 2017–18
- Jude Nworuh – Chennaiyin – 2017–18
- Kalu Uche – Pune City, Delhi Dynamos, ATK – 2015, 2017–19
- Penn Orji – Kerala Blasters – 2014
- Ranti Martins – Goa – 2014
- **Stephen Eze** – **Jamshedpur** – 2020–21, 2024–

=== Senegal ===
- Badara Badji – Delhi Dynamos – 2016
- Diawandou Diagne – Odisha – 2019–20
- Diomansy Kamara – NorthEast United – 2015
- Elhadji Ndoye – Kerala Blasters – 2016
- Fallou Diagne – Chennaiyin – 2022–23
- Ibrahima Niasse – Delhi Dynamos – 2016
- Massamba Sambou – NorthEast United – 2014
- Modou Sougou – Mumbai City – 2018–20
- Momar Ndoye – Pune City – 2016
- **Mourtada Fall** – Goa, Mumbai City, **Odisha** – 2018–
- Moustapha Gning – Kerala Blasters – 2019–20
- Talla N'Diaye – Jamshedpur – 2017–18
- Victor Mendy – NorthEast United – 2015

=== South Africa ===
- Cole Alexander – Odisha – 2020–21
- Sameehg Doutie – ATK, Jamshedpur – 2015–16, 2017–18
- Sibongakonke Mbatha – ATK – 2017–18

=== Tunisia ===
- Amine Chermiti – Mumbai City – 2019–20
- Mohamed Larbi – Mumbai City – 2019–20
- Selim Benachour – Mumbai City – 2015

=== Uganda ===
- Kizito Keziron – Kerala Blasters – 2017–19

=== Zambia ===
- Isaac Chansa – NorthEast United – 2014
- Kondwani Mtonga – NorthEast United – 2014

=== Zimbabwe ===
- Costa Nhamoinesu – Kerala Blasters – 2020–21

== Asia (AFC) ==
=== Afghanistan ===
- Zohib Islam Amiri – Goa – 2014
- Masih Saighani – Chennaiyin – 2019–20

=== Australia ===
- Aaron Evans – NorthEast United – 2022–23
- **Aleksandar Jovanovic** – **Bengaluru** – 2022–
- Andrew Barisic – Kerala Blasters – 2014
- Apostolos Giannou – Kerala Blasters – 2022–2023
- Brad Inman – Mohun Bagan SG, Odisha, Mumbai City – 2020–22
- Brendan Hamill – Mohun Bagan SG – 2022–24
- Chris Herd – Chennaiyin – 2018–19
- David Williams – ATK, Mohun Bagan SG – 2019–22
- **Dimitri Petratos** – **Mohun Bagan SG** – 2022–
- Dylan Fox – NorthEast United, Goa – 2020–22
- Eli Babalj – ATK – 2018–19
- Erik Paartalu – Bengaluru – 2017–21
- Harry Sawyer – Jamshedpur – 2022–2023
- Jacob Tratt – Odisha – 2020–21
- James Donachie – Goa – 2020–21
- **Jamie Maclaren** – **Mohun Bagan SG** – 2024–
- **Jason Cummings** – **Mohun Bagan SG** – 2023–
- **Jaushua Sotirio** – **Kerala Blasters** – 2023–
- Joel Chianese – Hyderabad – 2020–2023
- Joe Knowles – Hyderabad – 2023
- **Jordan Murray** – Kerala Blasters, **Jamshedpur**, Chennaiyin – 2020–22, 2023–
- Jordan O'Doherty – East Bengal – 2022–2023
- Nick Fitzgerald – Jamshedpur – 2020–21
- Osama Malik – Odisha – 2022–23
- Paulo Retre – Goa – 2023–24
- Rostyn Griffiths – Mumbai City – 2022–2023
- **Ryan Williams** – **Bengaluru** – 2023–
- Scott Neville – East Bengal – 2020–21
- Tim Cahill – Jamshedpur – 2018–19
- Tolgay Özbey – Goa – 2014
- **Tomi Juric** – **NorthEast United** – 2024–
- Tomislav Mrčela – East Bengal – 2021–22

=== Bhutan ===
- Chencho Gyeltshen – Bengaluru, Kerala Blasters – 2018–19, 2021–22

=== Iran ===
- Iman Basafa – Bengaluru – 2021–22
- Vafa Hakhamaneshi – Chennaiyin – 2022–2023

=== Japan ===
- Katsumi Yusa – NorthEast United – 2016
- Robert Cullen – NorthEast United – 2016
- **Cy Goddard** – Mumbai City, Odisha, **Hyderabad** – 2020–21, 2023–
- Daisuke Sakai – Kerala Blasters – 2023–24
- **Rei Tachikawa** – **Jamshedpur** – 2023–

=== Jordan ===
- **Hijazi Maher** – **East Bengal** – 2023–

=== Kyrgyzstan ===
- Mirlan Murzaev – Chennaiyin – 2021–22

=== Malaysia ===
- Liridon Krasniqi – Odisha – 2021–22

=== Nepal ===
- Ananta Tamang – East Bengal – 2022
- Kiran Chemjong – Punjab FC– 2023–24

=== Palestine ===
- Carlos Salom – Chennaiyin – 2018–19
- Yaser Hamed – NorthEast United – 2023

=== South Korea ===
- Do Dong-hyun – NorthEast United – 2014
- Park Kwang-il – Pune City – 2014

=== Syria ===
- Fares Arnaout – Goa – 2022–23
- **Thaer Krouma** – **Mumbai City** – 2024–

=== Tajikistan ===
- Fatkhullo Fatkhuloev – Chennaiyin – 2020–21

=== Uzbekistan ===
- **Mirjalol Kasimov** – **Mohammedan** – 2024–

== Europe (UEFA) ==
=== Albania ===
- **Armando Sadiku** – Mohun Bagan SG, **Goa** – 2023–

=== Armenia ===
- Apoula Edel – ATK, Chennaiyin, Pune City – 2014–16

=== Austria ===
- Marko Stanković – Pune City, Hyderabad – 2017–19
- Marco Sahanek – NorthEast United – 2022

=== Belgium ===
- Benjamin Lambot – NorthEast United – 2020–21
- Kristof Van Hout – Delhi Dynamos – 2014
- Wim Raymaekers – Delhi Dynamos – 2014

=== Bosnia and Herzegovina ===
- Enes Sipović – Chennaiyin, Kerala Blasters – 2020–22
- **Asmir Suljić** – **Punjab** – 2024–
- Samir Zeljković – Mohun Bagan, Punjab – 2025–

=== Bulgaria ===
- Dimitar Berbatov – Kerala Blasters – 2017–18

=== Croatia ===
- Antonio Perošević – East Bengal – 2021–22
- **Filip Mrzljak** – **Punjab** – 2024–
- Franjo Prce – East Bengal – 2021–22
- **Ivan Novoselec** – **Punjab** – 2024–
- Marko Lešković –Kerala Blasters – 2021–2024
- Mato Grgić – NorthEast United, Mumbai City – 2018–20
- Mislav Komorski – NorthEast United – 2018–20
- Petar Sliskovic – Chennaiyin – 2022–2023

=== Cyprus ===
- Charalambos Kyriakou – East Bengal – 2022–23

=== Czech Republic ===
- Jakub Podaný – ATK – 2014
- Jan Šeda – Goa – 2014
- Jan Štohanzl – Mumbai City – 2014
- Marek Čech – Delhi Dynamos – 2014
- Miroslav Slepička – Goa – 2014
- Pavel Čmovš – Mumbai City – 2014–15
- Pavel Eliáš – Delhi Dynamos – 2014
- Tomáš Josl – NorthEast United – 2014

=== Denmark ===
- Mads Junker – Delhi Dynamos – 2014
- Morten Skoubo – Delhi Dynamos – 2014
- Michael Jakobsen – NorthEast United – 2022
- Oliver Drost – Bengaluru – 2024

=== England ===
- Adam Le Fondre – Mumbai City – 2020–21
- Adil Nabi – Delhi Dynamos – 2015
- Carl Baker – ATK – 2017–18
- Chris Dagnall – Kerala Blasters – 2015
- Conor Thomas – ATK – 2017–18
- Curtis Main – Bengaluru – 2023
- David James – Kerala Blasters – 2014
- Gary Hooper – Kerala Blasters – 2020–21
- Jake Jervis – East Bengal – 2023
- James Bailey – Pune City – 2015
- James Keene – NorthEast United – 2014
- Jermaine Pennant – Pune City – 2014
- Jay Emmanuel-Thomas – Jamshedpur – 2022–2023
- John Johnson – Bengaluru, ATK – 2017–20
- Marcus Williams – Kerala Blasters – 2015
- Matt Derbyshire – NorthEast United – 2022
- Matt Mills – Pune City – 2018–19
- Matthew Kilgallon – Hyderabad – 2019–20
- Michael Chopra – Kerala Blasters – 2014, 2016
- Nicky Shorey – Pune City – 2015
- Paul Rachubka – Kerala Blasters – 2017–18
- Peter Hartley – Jamshedpur – 2020–2022
- Peter Ramage – Kerala Blasters – 2015
- Roger Johnson – Pune City – 2015
- **Ryan Edwards** – **Chennaiyin** – 2023–
- Ryan Taylor – ATK – 2017–18
- Steve Simonsen – Pune City – 2015
- Steven Bywater – Kerala Blasters – 2015
- Steven Taylor – Odisha – 2020–21
- Tom Thorpe – ATK – 2017–18
- Wes Brown – Kerala Blasters – 2017–18

=== Finland ===
- Joni Kauko – Mohun Bagan SG – 2021–24
- Jussi Jääskeläinen – ATK – 2017–18
- Njazi Kuqi – ATK – 2017–18
- Petteri Pennanen – Hyderabad – 2023

=== France ===
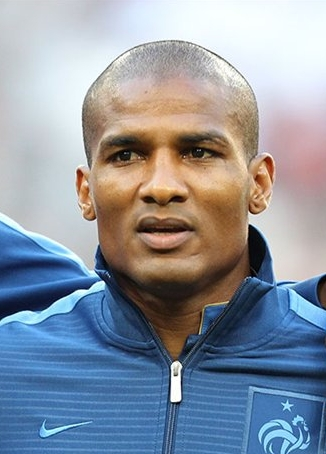
Florent Malouda was the Indian Super League Hero of the League in 2016.

- **Alexandre Coeff** – **Kerala Blasters** – 2024–
- Bernard Mendy – Chennaiyin – 2014–16
- Cédric Hengbart – Kerala Blasters, NorthEast United – 2014–16
- Cyril Kali – Kerala Blasters – 2018–19
- David Trezeguet – Pune City – 2014
- Florent Malouda – Delhi Dynamos – 2015–16
- **Florent Ogier** – **Mohammedan** – 2024–
- Gennaro Bracigliano – Chennaiyin, NorthEast United – 2014–15
- **Hugo Boumous** – Goa, Mumbai City, Mohun Bagan SG, **Odisha** – 2018–
- **Jérémy Manzorro** – Jamshedpur, **Mumbai City** 2023–
- Johan Letzelter – Mumbai City – 2014
- Mikaël Silvestre – Chennaiyin – 2014
- Romain Philippoteaux – NorthEast United – 2022–24
- **Madih Talal** – Punjab, **East Bengal** – 2023–
- Nicolas Anelka – Mumbai City – 2014–15
- Raphaël Romey – Kerala Blasters – 2014
- Robert Pires – Goa – 2014
- Sylvain Monsoreau – ATK – 2014
- Youness Bengelloun – Goa – 2014
- Zakaria Diallo – NorthEast United – 2021–22

=== Germany ===
- Julius Düker – Chennaiyin – 2022–23
- Manuel Friedrich – Mumbai City – 2014
- Matti Steinmann – East Bengal – 2020–21

=== Greece ===
- Alexandros Tzorvas – NorthEast United – 2014
- **Dimitrios Chatziisaias** – **Punjab** – 2023–
- **Dimitrios Diamantakos** – Kerala Blasters, **East Bengal** – 2022–
- Ilias Pollalis – Mumbai City – 2014
- **Nikos Karelis** – **Mumbai City** – 2024–
- Kostas Katsouranis – Pune City – 2014
- Panagiotis Triadis – NorthEast United – 2018–19

=== Hungary ===
- Krisztián Vadócz – Pune City, Mumbai City – 2014, 2016
- Vladimir Koman – Chennaiyin – 2021–22

=== Iceland ===
- Gudjon Baldvinsson – Kerala Blasters – 2017–18

=== Italy ===
- Alessandro Del Piero – Delhi Dynamos – 2014
- Alessandro Nesta – Chennaiyin – 2014
- Alessandro Potenza – Chennaiyin – 2016
- Bruno Cirillo – Pune City – 2014
- Cristian Battocchio – Chennaiyin – 2023–2024
- Daniele Magliocchetti – Pune City – 2014
- Davide Colomba – Pune City – 2014
- Davide Succi – Chennaiyin – 2016
- Emanuele Belardi – Pune City – 2014
- Francesco Franzese – Chennaiyin – 2014
- Manuele Blasi – Chennaiyin – 2015–16
- Marco Materazzi – Chennaiyin – 2014
- Maurizio Peluso – Chennaiyin – 2016

=== Lithuania ===
- Nauris Petkevičius – Inter Kashi – 2025–26
- Nerijus Valskis – Chennaiyin, Jamshedpur – 2019–22
- Fedor Černych – Kerala Blasters – 2024

=== North Macedonia ===
- Vlatko Drobarov – Kerala Blasters – 2019–20

=== Malta ===
- André Schembri – Chennaiyin – 2019–20

=== Montenegro ===
- **Miloš Drinčić** – **Kerala Blasters** – 2023–
- Slavko Damjanović – Chennaiyin, Mohun Bagan SG, Bengaluru – 2021–22, 2023–24

=== Netherlands ===
- Abdenasser El Khayati – Chennaiyin, Mumbai City – 2022–2023
- Darren Sidoel – East Bengal – 2021–22
- Gianni Zuiverloon – Delhi Dynamos – 2018–20
- Gregory Nelson – Chennaiyin – 2017–19
- Hans Mulder – Delhi Dynamos, Chennaiyin – 2014–16
- Jeroen Lumu – Delhi Dynamos – 2017–18
- John Goossens – Pune City – 2014
- Kai Heerings – NorthEast United – 2019–20
- **Keziah Veendorp** – **Bengaluru** – 2023–
- Mark Sifneos – Kerala Blasters, Goa – 2017–18
- Serginho Greene – Delhi Dynamos – 2015
- Stijn Houben – Delhi Dynamos – 2014
- Wesley Verhoek – Pune City – 2015
- **Yoell van Nieff** – **Mumbai City** – 2023–

=== Northern Ireland ===
- Aaron Hughes – Kerala Blasters – 2016
- Martin Paterson – ATK – 2017–18

=== Norway ===
- John Arne Riise – Delhi Dynamos, Chennaiyin – 2015–16
- Kristian Opseth – Bengaluru – 2020–21
- Mushaga Bakenga – Punjab – 2024

=== Poland ===
- Ariel Borysiuk – Chennaiyin – 2021–22
- Łukasz Gikiewicz – Chennaiyin – 2021–22

=== Portugal ===
- André Preto – Mumbai City – 2014
- Bruno Pinheiro – Goa – 2014, 2017–18
- Edgar Marcelino – Goa – 2014
- Hélder Postiga – ATK – 2015–16
- Hélio Pinto – NorthEast United – 2017–18
- Henrique Dinis – Delhi Dynamos – 2014
- Henrique Sereno – ATK, Chennaiyin – 2016–18
- João Coimbra – Kerala Blasters – 2015
- José Gonçalves – NorthEast United – 2017–18
- Luís Machado – NorthEast United – 2020–21
- Miguel Garcia – NorthEast United – 2014
- Miguel Herlein – Goa – 2014
- **Nuno Reis** – **Mohun Bagan SG** – 2024–
- Paulo Machado – Mumbai City – 2018–20
- Silas – NorthEast United – 2015
- Simão Sabrosa – NorthEast United – 2015
- Tiago Ribeiro – Mumbai City – 2014
- Zequinha – ATK – 2017–18

=== Republic of Ireland ===
- Andy Keogh – NorthEast United – 2019–20
- Anthony Pilkington – East Bengal – 2020–21
- **Carl McHugh** – ATK, Mohun Bagan SG, **Goa** – 2019–
- Colin Falvey – Kerala Blasters – 2014
- Darren O'Dea – Mumbai City – 2015
- Graham Stack – Kerala Blasters – 2016
- Robbie Keane – ATK – 2017–18

=== Romania ===
- Adrian Mutu – Pune City – 2015
- Dragoș Firțulescu – Chennaiyin – 2019–20
- Lucian Goian – Mumbai City, Chennaiyin – 2016–20

=== Scotland ===
- **Connor Shields** – **Chennaiyin** – 2023–
- Danny Fox – East Bengal – 2020–21
- **Greg Stewart** – Jamshedpur, Mumbai City, **Mohun Bagan SG** – 2021–2023, 2024–
- Jamie McAllister – Kerala Blasters – 2014
- Stephen Pearson – Kerala Blasters, ATK – 2014, 2016
- **Tom Aldred** – **Mohun Bagan SG** – 2024–

=== Serbia ===
- Alen Stevanović – Jamshedpur – 2023–24
- Andrija Kaluđerović – Delhi Dynamos – 2018–19
- Damir Grgič – Pune City – 2017–18
- **Dejan Dražić** – **Goa** – 2024–
- Dejan Lekić – ATK – 2015
- **Lazar Ćirković** – Chennaiyin, **Jamshedpur** – 2023–
- Marko Klisura – Mumbai City – 2018–19
- Nemanja Lakić-Pešić – Kerala Blasters – 2017–19
- Nikola Krčmarević – Kerala Blasters – 2018–19
- Slaviša Stojanović – Kerala Blasters – 2018–19
- **Stefan Šapić** – **Hyderabad** – 2024–

=== Slovakia ===
- Jakub Sylvestr – Chennaiyin – 2020–21

=== Slovenia ===
- Amir Dervišević – East Bengal – 2021–22
- **Luka Majcen** – **Punjab** – 2023–
- Matej Poplatnik – Kerala Blasters – 2018–19
- Rene Mihelič – Chennaiyin, Delhi Dynamos – 2017–19

=== Spain ===
- Adrià Carmona – Delhi Dynamos – 2018–19
- Adrián Colunga – Goa – 2017–18
- Agus Garcia –ATK – 2019–20
- Airam Cabrera – Goa – 2021–22
- Aitor – Mumbai City – 2015
- Aitor Monroy – Jamshedpur – 2019–21
- Albert Serrán – Bengaluru – 2018–20
- **Alberto Noguera** – Goa, Mumbai City, **Bengaluru** – 2020–
- **Alberto Rodríguez** – **Mohun Bagan SG** – 2024–
- Álex Barrera – Bengaluru – 2018–19
- Alfred Planas – Inter Kashi – 2025–26
- Álvaro Vázquez – Kerala Blasters, Goa – 2021–2023
- Andrea Orlandi – Chennaiyin – 2018–19
- Aridai Cabrera – Odisha – 2021–
- Aridane Santana – Odisha – Hyderabad – 2019–21
- Arnal Llibert – ATK – 2014
- Basilio Agudo –ATK – 2014
- Borja Fernández – ATK – 2014–16
- **Borja Herrera** – Hyderabad, East Bengal, **FC Goa** – 2022–
- Bruno –Delhi Dynamos, NorthEast United, Pune City – 2014–16
- Carlos Calvo – Jamshedpur – 2018–20
- **Carlos Delgado** – **Odisha** – 2019–20, 2022–
- Carlos Marchena – Kerala Blasters – 2015
- **Carlos Martínez** – **Goa** – 2023–
- Carlos Peňa – Goa – 2018–20
- Sergio Juste – Goa – 2017–18
- Coro – Goa – 2017–20
- Cristian Bustos – Mumbai City – 2015
- Cristian Hidalgo – Chennaiyin – 2014
- Dani Mallo – ATK – 2016
- Daniel Lucas Segovia – Bengaluru – 2017–18
- David Grande – Jamshedpur – 2019–21
- David Humanes – Inter Kashi – 2025–26
- Dimas Delgado – Bengaluru – 2017–21
- **Édgar Méndez** – **Bengaluru** – 2024–
- Edu Bedia – Goa – 2017–2023
- Edu García – Bengaluru, ATK, Mohun Bagan SG, Hyderabad – 2017–18, 2018–22
- Edu Moya – Delhi Dynamos – 2017–18
- Francisco Dorronsoro – Odisha – 2018–20
- Fran González – Bengaluru – 2020–21
- Francisco Sandaza – Hyderabad – 2020–21
- **Guillermo Fernández** – **NorthEast United** – 2024–
- Hector Rodas – Odisha – 2021–22
- **Héctor Yuste** – Mohun Bagan SG, **East Bengal** – 2023–
- Hernán Santana – Mumbai City, NorthEast United, Goa – 2020–22, 2023–
- Igor Angulo – Goa, Mumbai City – 2020–22
- **Iker Guarrotxena** – **Goa**, Mumbai City – 2022–23, 2024–
- Iñigo Calderón – Chennaiyin – 2017–19
- Iván Garrido González – Goa, East Bengal – 2020–2023
- Jaime Gavilán – ATK, Chennaiyi – 2015, 2017–18
- Javi Fernández – Mumbai City – 2014
- **Javi Hernandez** – ATK, Mohun Bagan SG, Odisha, Bengaluru, **Jamshedpur** – 2019–
- Javi Lara – ATK – 2016
- **Javier Siverio** – Hyderabad, East Bengal, **Jamshedpur** – 2021–
- **Jesús Jiménez** – **Kerala Blasters** – 2024–
- Jesús Tato – Pune City – 2016
- Joan Capdevila – NorthEast United – 2014
- Jofre Mateu – ATK, Goa – 2014–16
- Jonathan Vila – Pune City – 2018–19
- **Jon Toral** – **Mumbai City** – 2024–
- Jordi Figueras – ATK – 2017–18
- Jorge Alonso – ATK – 2015
- Jorge Ortiz – Goa – 2020–22
- **José Antonio Pardo** – **East Bengal** – 2023–
- Joseba Beitia – NorthEast United – 2023
- Josemi – ATK – 2014
- Josu – Kerala Blasters – 2015–16
- Juan Aguilera – Mumbai City – 2015
- Juan Belencoso – ATK – 2016
- Juan Calatayud – ATK – 2015
- **Juan Mera** – **Punjab** – 2023–
- Juanan – Bengaluru, Hyderabad – 2017–22
- Juande – Kerala Blasters – 2021
- Koke – NorthEast United – 2014
- Lluís Sastre – Hyderabad – 2020–21
- Lluis Tarres – Inter Kashi – 2025–26
- Lolo – Pune City – 2017–18
- Luis García – ATK – 2014
- Luisma – Bengaluru – 2018–19
- Mandi – ATK – 2019–20
- Manuel Arana – Goa, Delhi Dynamos –2017–18
- Manuel Lanzarote – Goa, ATK, Chennaiyin – 2017–19, 2021
- Manuel Onwu – Bengaluru, Odisha – 2019–21
- Marcos Tébar – Odisha, Pune City – 2016–20
- Mario Arqués – Jamshedpur, Kerala Blasters – 2018–20
- Mario Barco – Inter Kashi – 2025–26
- Martí Crespí – Delhi Dynamos – 2018–19
- **Míchel Zabaco** – **NorthEast United** – 2023–
- Miguel Palanca – Delhi Dynamos – 2018–19
- **Néstor Albiach** – **NorthEast United** – 2023–
- Nili – Bengaluru – 2019–20
- Noé Acosta – Jamshedpur – 2019–20
- Néstor Gordillo – Hyderabad – 2019–21
- **Odei Onaindia** – Hyderabad, **Goa** – 2020–21, 2022–
- Pablo Morgado Blanco – Jamshedpur – 2018–19
- Pablo Pérez – Bengaluru – 2022–2024
- **Pedro Capó** – **Bengaluru** – 2024–
- Pitu – Pune City – 2016
- Piti – Jamshedpur – 2019–20
- Pulga – Kerala Blasters – 2014–15, 2017–18
- Rafa – Pune City, Hyderabad – 2017–18, 2019–20
- Rafa Jordá – Mumbai City – 2017–18
- Rubén González Rocha – Delhi Dynamos – 2016
- **Saúl Crespo** – Odisha, **East Bengal** – 2022–
- Sergio Castel – Jamshedpur – 2019–20
- Sergio Cidoncha – Jamshedpur, Kerala Blasters – 2018–21
- Sergio Llamas – Inter Kashi – 2025–26
- **Tiri** – ATK, Jamshedpur, Mohun Bagan SG, **Mumbai City** – 2015–
- Toni Doblas – Delhi Dynamos – 2015–16
- Toni Dovale – Bengaluru – 2017–18
- Víctor Mongil – ATK, Odisha, Kerala Blasters – 2019–20, 2021–2023
- Victor Pérez – Bengaluru – 2017–18
- Vicente Gómez Umpiérrez – Kerala Blasters – 2020–21
- **Víctor Vázquez** – **East Bengal** – 2024–
- **Víctor Rodríguez** – Odisha, **Goa** – 2022–
- Xabi Irureta – Delhi Dynamos – 2017–18
- Xisco Hernandez – Bengaluru, Odisha – 2019–21

=== Sweden ===
- Bojan Djordjic – Chennaiyin – 2014
- Freddie Ljungberg – Mumbai City – 2014
- Maic Sema – NorthEast United – 2017–18
- Simon Lundevall – NorthEast United – 2019–20

=== Turkey ===
- Tuncay Şanlı – Pune City – 2015

=== Ukraine ===
- Ivan Kalyuzhnyi – Kerala Blasters – 2022–2023

=== Wales ===
- Aaron Amadi-Holloway – East Bengal – 2020–21
- David Cotterill – ATK – 2017–18

== North and Central America, Caribbean (CONCACAF) ==
=== Canada ===
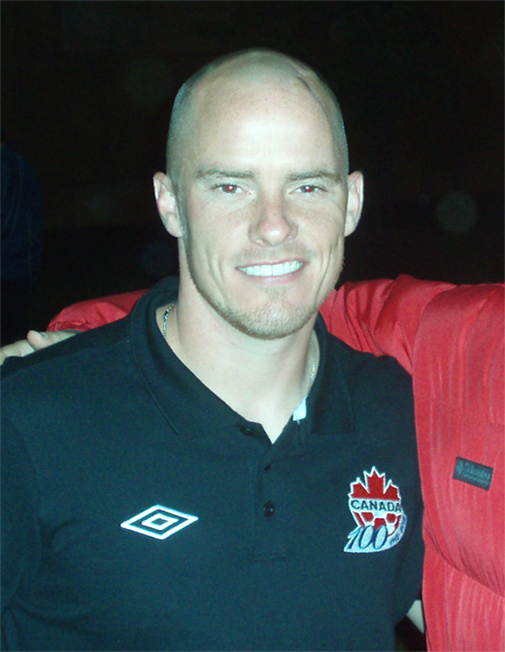
Iain Hume won the first ever Indian Super League Hero of the League in 2014.

- Iain Hume – Kerala Blasters, ATK, Pune City – 2014–19

=== Costa Rica ===
- Yendrick Ruiz – Pune City – 2015
- Jonathan Moya – Hyderabad – 2023–
- **Felicio Brown Forbes** – **East Bengal** – 2024–

=== Curaçao ===
- Guyon Fernandez – Delhi Dynamos – 2017–18

=== Grenada ===
- Antonio German – Kerala Blasters – 2015–16

=== Haiti ===
- Duckens Nazon – Kerala Blasters – 2016
- Frantz Bertin – Mumbai City – 2015
- Jean-Eudes Maurice – Chennaiyin – 2014
- Kervens Belfort – Kerala Blasters, Jamshedpur – 2016–18
- Sony Norde – Mumbai City – 2015–16

=== Jamaica ===
- Duwayne Kerr – Chennaiyin – 2015
- Giles Barnes – Hyderabad – 2019–20
- Kevaughn Frater – Bengaluru – 2019–20
- Deshorn Brown – Bengaluru, NorthEast United – 2019–21

=== Martinique ===
- Frédéric Piquionne – Mumbai City – 2015
- Grégory Arnolin – Goa – 2014–15
- Mathias Coureur – NorthEast United – 2021

=== Mexico ===
- Aníbal Zurdo – Pune City – 2016
- Oswaldo Alanís – Hyderabad – 2023
- Ulises Dávila – Delhi Dynamos – 2018–19

=== Suriname ===
- Roland Alberg – Hyderabad – 2021

=== Trinidad and Tobago ===
- Cornell Glen – NorthEast United – 2014

== Oceania (OFC) ==
=== Fiji ===
Player	Club	Year
Roy Krishna	ATK, Mohun Bagan SG, Bengaluru, Odisha	2019–2025

=== New Zealand ===
Player	Club	Year
Leo Bertos	NorthEast United	2014

== South America (CONMEBOL) ==
=== Argentina ===
- **Alexis Gómez** – **Mohammedan** – 2024–
- Carlos Javier López – NorthEast United – 2015
- Diego Colotto – Pune City – 2015
- Diego Nadaya – Mumbai City – 2014
- **Ezequiel Vidal** – **Punjab** – 2024–
- Facundo Cardozo – Mumbai City – 2016
- Facundo Pereyra – Kerala Blasters – 2020–21
- Gastón Sangoy – Mumbai City – 2016
- Gustavo Oberman – Pune City – 2016
- **Jorge Pereyra Díaz** – Kerala Blasters, Mumbai City, **Bengaluru** – 2021–
- Martín Pérez Guedes – Odisha – 2019–20
- Matías Defederico – Mumbai City – 2016
- Maximiliano Barreiro – NorthEast United – 2019–20
- Nicolás Vélez – NorthEast United – 2015–16
- Robertino Pugliara – Pune City – 2017–18

=== Brazil ===
- Alan Costa – Bengaluru – 2021–23
- Alex Lima – Jamshedpur, East Bengal – 2020–23
- André Moritz – Mumbai City – 2014–15
- André Santos – Goa – 2014
- **Andrei Alba** – **Hyderabad** – 2024–
- Bobô – Hyderabad – 2019–20
- Bruno Pelissari – Chennaiyin, Delhi Dynamos – 2014–16
- Bruno Perone – Kerala Blasters – 2015
- Bruno Ramires – Bengaluru – 2021–23
- Cafu – Mumbai City – 2016
- Cássio Gabriel – Mumbai City – 2021–22
- Chicão – Delhi Dynamos – 2015
- **Cleiton Silva** – Bengaluru, **East Bengal** – 2020–
- Danilo – NorthEast United – 2017–18
- Diego Carlos – Pune City, Mumbai City – 2017–20
- **Diego Maurício** – **Odisha**, Mumbai City – 2020–21, 2022–
- **Dori** – **Odisha** – 2024–
- Éder Monteiro – Chennaiyin – 2015–16
- Elano – Chennaiyin – 2014–15
- Eli Sabiá – Chennaiyin, Jamshedpur – 2016, 2018–2023
- Elinton Andrade – Goa – 2015
- **Elsinho** – Jamshedpur, **Chennaiyin** – 2023–
- Erwin Spitzner – Kerala Blasters – 2014
- Éverton Santos – Mumbai City, ATK – 2017–19
- **França** – **Mohammedan** – 2024–
- Gerson Vieira – Mumbai City, ATK – 2016–19
- Guilherme Batata – NorthEast United – 2014
- Gustavo Lazzaretti – NorthEast United – 2016
- Gustavo Marmentini – Delhi Dynamos – 2015
- Ibson Melo – NorthEast United – 2023
- **João Victor** – **Hyderabad** – 2020–
- Jonatan Lucca – Goa, Pune City – 2015–18
- Jonathas de Jesus – Odisha – 2021–22
- Júlio César – Goa – 2016
- Léo Costa – Mumbai City – 2017–18
- Léo Moura – Goa – 2015
- Luciano Sabrosa – Goa – 2015–16
- Lúcio – Goa – 2015–16
- **Lukas Brambilla** – **Chennaiyin** – 2024–
- Maílson Alves – Chennaiyin, NorthEast United – 2015–19
- Marcelinho – Odisha, Pune City, Hyderabad, Mohun Bagan SG, NorthEast United – 2016–22
- Marcinho – NorthEast United – 2017–18
- Márcio Rosário – Mumbai City – 2017–18
- Matheus Gonçalves – Goa, Jamshedpur – 2016–18
- Memo – Delhi Dynamos, Jamshedpur, Chennaiyin – 2016–21
- Paulinho Dias – Delhi Dynamos – 2017–18
- Felipe Amorim – Hyderabad– 2023
- Rafael Bastos – Mumbai City – 2018–19
- Rafael Coelho – Goa – 2015–16
- Rafael Dumas – Goa – 2016
- **Rafael Crivellaro** – **Chennaiyin**, Jamshedpur – 2019–2022, 2022–
- Raphael Augusto – Chennaiyin, Bengaluru – 2015–20
- Richarlyson – Goa – 2016
- Reinaldo – Goa – 2015–16
- Roberto Carlos – Delhi Dynamos – 2015
- Roberto Volpato – Mumbai City – 2016
- Rodrigo Arroz – Kerala Blasters – 2015
- Thiago Cunha – Mumbai City – 2016
- Thiago Santos – Mumbai City – 2017–18
- Vinícius – Delhi Dynamos – 2015
- Wellington de Lima Gomes – NorthEast United – 2016
- Wellington Priori – NorthEast United, Jamshedpur – 2016–18, 2022
- Ygor Catatau – Mumbai City – 2021
- Eliandro – East Bengal – 2022

=== Colombia ===
- Andrés González – Pune City – 2014
- Jairo Suárez – Chennaiyin – 2014
- Janeiler Rivas Palacios – NorthEast United – 2018–19
- John Mosquera – NorthEast United – 2017–18
- José David Leudo – NorthEast United – 2018–20
- Luis Yanes – NorthEast United – 2014
- Omar Andrés Rodríguez – Pune City – 2014
- Stiven Mendoza – Chennaiyin – 2014–15
- **Wilmar Jordán** – NorthEast United, Punjab, **Chennaiyin** – 2022–

=== Uruguay ===
- **Adrián Luna** – **Kerala Blasters** – 2021–
- Diego Forlán – Mumbai City – 2015
- Emiliano Alfaro – NorthEast United, Pune City, ATK – 2016–19
- Federico Gallego – NorthEast United, Mohun Bagan SG – 2018–22, 2023
- Juan Cruz Mascia – NorthEast United – 2018–19
- Martín Cháves – NorthEast United – 2019–20
- Martin Diaz – NorthEast United, Pune City – 2017–19
- Matías Mirabaje – Delhi Dynamos, Mumbai City – 2017–19
- Sasha Aneff – NorthEast United – 2016

=== Venezuela ===
- Gabriel Cichero – Delhi Dynamos – 2017–18
- Miku – Bengaluru – 2017–19

== Notes ==
1. Born in Argentina
2. Born in Brazil
3. Born in Cameroon
4. Born in England
5. Born in France
6. Born in Germany
7. Born in Greece
8. Born in the Netherlands
9. Born in New Caledonia
10. Born in Northern Ireland
11. Born in Portugal
12. Born in Scotland
13. Born in South Korea
14. Born in Spain
15. Born in Switzerland
16. Born in Ukraine
17. Born in the United States of America
18. Born in Yugoslavia
19. Capped for the Albania national under-21 football team
20. Capped for the DR Congo national football team
21. Capped for the England national under-19 football team
22. Capped for the England national under-21 football team
23. Capped for the France national football B team
24. Capped for the France national under-20 football team
25. Capped for the France national football team
26. Capped for the Germany national under-19 football team
27. Capped for the Germany national under-20 football team
28. Capped for the Greece national under-19 football team
29. Capped for the Greece national under-21 football team
30. Capped for the Greece national football team
31. Capped for the Kosovo national football team
32. Capped for the Netherlands national under-19 football team
33. Capped for the Portugal national under-17 football team
34. Capped for the Scotland national under-19 football team
35. Capped for the Scotland national under-21 football team
36. Capped for the Scotland national football team
37. Capped for the Samoa national under-20 football team
38. Capped for the Spain national under-19 football team
39. Capped for the Spain national under-20 football team
40. Capped for the Spain national under-21 football team

== See also ==
- List of Indian Super League records and statistics
- List of Indian Super League seasons
- List of Indian Super League owners
- List of Indian Super League head coaches
- Indian Super League attendance
- List of Indian Super League hat-tricks
- List of foreign football players in India
