= Indian Super League records and statistics =

The Indian Super League is an Indian professional league for association football. At the top of the Indian football league system, it is the country's primary football competition and is contested by 13 clubs. This page details the records and statistics of the league since its first season in 2014.

As of 21 May 2026.

== Club records ==
=== Titles ===
- Most titles: 3, ATK (2014, 2016, 2019–20)
- Biggest league winning margin: 8 points, 2024–25; Mohun Bagan (56 points) over Goa (48 points)
- Smallest league winning margin: 0 points, 6 head-to-head points, 2020–21; Mumbai City (6) over Mohun Bagan (0). Both finished on 40 points, but Mumbai City won the title on head-to-head points.

=== Points ===
- Most points in a season: 56, Mohun Bagan (2024–25)
- Most home points in a season: 34, Mohun Bagan (2024–25)
- Most away points in a season: 28, Mohun Bagan (2023–24)
- Fewest points in a season: 3, Mohammedan (2025–26)
- Fewest home points in a season: 0, Mohammedan (2025–26)
- Fewest away points in a season: 1, NorthEast United (2022–23)
- Fewest points in a season while winning the league: 39, Goa (2019–20)

=== Wins ===
- Most wins in total: 108, Mumbai City
- Most wins in a season: 17, Mohun Bagan (2024–25)
- Most home wins in a season: 11, Mohun Bagam (2024–25)
- Most away wins in a season: 9, Mohun Bagan (2023–24)
- Fewest wins in a season: 0, Mohammedan (2025–26)
- Fewest home wins in a season: 0
  - Chennaiyin (2020–21)
  - East Bengal (2021–22)
  - Hyderabad (2023–24)
  - Mohammedan (2025–26)
- Fewest away wins in a season: 0
  - Mumbai City (2014)
  - Pune City (2015)
  - NorthEast United (2021–22, 2022–23)
  - Bengaluru (2023–24)
  - Mohammedan (2025–26)
- Most consecutive wins: 11, Mumbai City (12 November 2022 – 27 January 2023)
- Most consecutive matches without a win: 20, Hyderabad (9 March 2023 – 4 March 2024)

=== Defeats ===
- Most defeats in total: 95, NorthEast United
- Most defeats in a season: 16
  - NorthEast United (2022–23)
  - Hyderabad (2023–24)
- Most home defeats in a season: 9, Hyderabad (2023–24)
- Most away defeats in a season: 8
  - Hyderabad (2019–20)
  - NorthEast United (2022–23)
  - Bengaluru (2023–24)
- Fewest defeats in a season: 1
  - East Bengal (2025–26)
  - Mohun Bagan (2025–26)
- Fewest home defeats in a season: 0
  - Odisha (2016)
  - Bengaluru (2018–19)
  - Odisha (2023–24)
  - Mohun Bagan (2024–25)
- Fewest away defeats in a season: 0
  - East Bengal (2025–26)
  - Bengaluru (2025–26)
  - Mohun Bagan (2025–26)
- Most consecutive matches undefeated: 18, Mumbai City (9 October 2022 – 11 February 2023)
- Most consecutive defeats:10, NorthEast United (8 October – 17 December 2022)

=== Draws ===
- Most draws in total: 66, NorthEast United
- Most draws in a season: 11
  - Hyderabad (2020–21)
  - Chennaiyin (2020–21)
- Most home draws in a season: 7, Chennaiyin (2020–21)
- Most away draws in a season: 6
  - Jamshedpur (2018–19)
  - Hyderabad (2020–21)
  - NorthEast United (2020–21)
- Fewest draws in a season: 1
  - Chennaiyin (2015)
  - Bengaluru (2017–18, 2022–23)
  - East Bengal (2022–23)
  - Kerala Blasters (2022–23)
- Fewest home draws in a season: 0
  - Chennaiyin (2015)
  - ATK (2015)
  - NorthEast United (2016, 2025–26)
  - Pune City (2017–18)
  - Mumbai City (2017–18)
  - Mohun Bagan (2022–23)
  - Bengaluru (2022–23)
  - Goa (2022–23)
  - Kerala Blasters (2022–23)
  - Inter Kashi (2025–26)
  - Mohammedan (2025–26)
- Fewest away draws in a season: 0
  - Delhi Dynamos FC (2015)
  - Bengaluru (2017–18)
  - Hyderabad (2019–20)
  - East Bengal (2022–23)
- Most consecutive draws: 6, Goa (17 January – 13 February 2021)

=== Goals ===
- Most goals scored in a season: 54, Mumbai City (2022–23)
- Fewest goals scored in a season: 7, Mohammedan (2025–26)
- Most goals conceded in a season: 51, NorthEast United (2022–23)
- Fewest goals conceded in a season: 9
  - Mumbai City (2025–26)
  - Mohun Bagan (2025–26)
- Best goal difference in a season: 33, Mumbai City (2022–23)
- Worst goal difference in a season: –35, NorthEast United (2022–23)
- Most goals scored at home in a season: 26, Mohun Bagan (2024–25)
- Fewest goals scored at home in a season: 1, Mohammedan (2025–26)
- Most goals conceded at home in a season: 28, NorthEast United (2022–23)
- Fewest goals conceded at home in a season: 2, Kerala Blasters (2014)
- Most goals scored away in a season: 30, Mumbai City (2022–23)
- Fewest goals scored away in a season: 3
  - Mumbai City (2014)
  - Kerala Blasters (2025–26)
- Most goals conceded away in a season: 27, NorthEast United (2022–23)
- Fewest goals conceded away in a season: 3, Mohun Bagan (2025–26)
- Most consecutive matches without scoring: 7, Chennaiyin (15 February – 10 November 2019)
- Most goals scored in total: 406, Goa
- Most goals conceded in total: 358, Odisha

=== Disciplinary ===
- Most yellow cards in total: 374, Mumbai City
- Most red cards in total: 22, Goa
- Most yellow cards in a season: 69, East Bengal (2023–24)
- Fewest yellow cards in a season: 17
  - Kerala Blasters (2014)
  - Mohammedan (2025–26)
- Most red cards in a season: 6, East Bengal (2024–25)

=== Awards ===
- Most Golden Boot winners: 3
  - Chennaiyin (2014, 2015, 2019–20)
  - Goa (2017–18, 2018–19, 2020–21)
- Most Golden Ball winners: 2
  - Goa (2018–19, 2019–20)
  - Mohun Bagan (2020–21, 2023–24)
- Most Golden Glove winners: 3, Mohun Bagan (2020–21, 2022–23, 2024–25)
- Most Emerging Player of the League winners: 3, Kerala Blasters (2014, 2017–18, 2018–19)
- Most Winning Pass of the League winners: 2, Goa (2019–20, 2020–21)

=== Attendances ===
- Highest attendance, single match: 68,340, Atlético de Kolkata 2–1 Chennaiyin (at Vivekananda Yuba Bharati Krirangan, 16 December 2015)
- Highest season average attendance: 52,008, Kerala Blasters (2015)
- Lowest season average attendance: 73, Inter Kashi (2025–26)

== Player records ==
=== Appearances ===
- Most Indian Super League appearances: 196
  - Pritam Kotal (from 14 October 2014)
  - Sunil Chhetri (from 16 October 2015)
- Appearance for most different clubs: 6
  - Subhashish Roy Chowdhury (ATK, Delhi Dynamos, Goa, Kerala Blasters, Jamshedpur and NorthEast United)
  - Arindam Bhattacharya (Pune City, Mumbai City, ATK, Mohun Bagan, East Bengal, NorthEast United)
- Oldest player: David James, 44 years and 141 days (for Kerala Blasters v. Atlético de Kolkata, 20 December 2014)
- Youngest player: Alfred Lalroutsang, 16 years and 239 days (for NorthEast United v. Hyderabad, 20 February 2020)

Most appearances
| Rank | Player | Apps | Position | First season | Last season |
|---|---|---|---|---|---|
| 1 | (India) Pritam Kotal | 196 | Defender | 2014 | 2025–26 |
| 1 | (India) Sunil Chhetri | 196 | Forward | 2015 | 2025–26 |
| 3 | (India) Amrinder Singh | 194 | Goalkeeper | 2015 | 2025–26 |
| 4 | (India) Rahul Bheke | 187 | Defender | 2014 | 2025–26 |
| 5 | (India) Lallianzuala Chhangte | 181 | Forward | 2016 | 2025–26 |
| 6 | (India) Subhasish Bose | 179 | Defender | 2017–18 | 2025–26 |
| 6 | (India) Mandar Rao Dessai | 179 | Defender | 2014 | 2025–26 |
| 8 | (India) Gurpreet Singh Sandhu | 177 | Goalkeeper | 2017–18 | 2025–26 |
| 9 | (India) Sandesh Jhingan | 172 | Defender | 2014 | 2025–26 |
| 10 | (India) Manvir Singh | 171 | Forward | 2017–18 | 2025–26 |

=== Goals ===
- First Indian Super League goal: Fikru Teferra (for Atlético de Kolkata v. Mumbai City, 12 October 2014)
- Most Indian Super League goals: 77, Sunil Chhetri
- Most Indian Super League goals at one club: 70, Sunil Chhetri (for Bengaluru)
- Oldest goalscorer: 41 years and 196 days, Sunil Chhetri (for Bengaluru v. SC Delhi, 15 February 2026)
- Youngest goalscorer: 17 years and 322 days, Singamayum Shami (for Punjab v. Hyderabad, 6 March 2025)

Bold denotes players still playing in the Indian Super League.

Top goalscorers
| Rank | Player | Goals | Apps | Ratio | Position | First goal | Last goal |
|---|---|---|---|---|---|---|---|
| 1 | (India) **Sunil Chhetri** | 77 | 196 | 0.39 | Forward | 2015 | 2025–26 |
| 2 | (Nigeria) Bartholomew Ogbeche | 63 | 98 | 0.64 | Forward | 2018–19 | 2022–23 |
| 3 | (Fiji) Roy Krishna | 58 | 116 | 0.5 | Forward | 2019–20 | 2024–25 |
| 4 | (India) **Lallianzuala Chhangte** | 50 | 181 | 0.28 | Forward | 2017–18 | 2025–26 |
| 5 | (Spain) Coro | 48 | 57 | 0.84 | Forward | 2017–18 | 2019–20 |
| 6 | (Brazil) Diego Maurício | 47 | 93 | 0.51 | Forward | 2020–21 | 2024–25 |
| 7 | (Brazil) Cleiton Silva | 36 | 96 | 0.38 | Forward | 2020–21 | 2024–25 |
| 7 | (France) Hugo Boumous | 36 | 124 | 0.29 | Midfielder | 2017–18 | 2024–25 |
| 9 | (Brazil) Marcelinho | 34 | 87 | 0.39 | Forward | 2016 | 2021–22 |
| 10 | (Argentina) **Jorge Pereyra Díaz** | 32 | 83 | 0.39 | Forward | 2021–22 | 2025–26 |

- Most goals in a season: 23, Alaaeddine Ajaraie (NorthEast United, 2024–25)
- Fastest goal: 12 seconds, David Williams (for Mohun Bagan SG v. Hyderabad, 5 January 2022)
- Most goals in a game: 4
  - Modou Sougou (for Mumbai City v. Kerala Blasters, 16 December 2018)
  - Jamie Maclaren (for Mohun Bagan v. Odisha, 6 March 2026)
- Most hat-tricks: 4, Bartholomew Ogbeche (for NorthEast United, Kerala Blasters and Hyderabad)
- Oldest player to score an Indian Super League hat-trick: 40 years and 126 days, Sunil Chhetri (for Bengaluru v. Kerala Blasters, 7 December 2024)
- Youngest player to score an Indian Super League hat-trick: 21 years and 73 days, Kiyan Nassiri (for Mohun Bagan v. East Bengal, 29 January 2022)
- Fastest hat-trick: 7 minutes, Coro (for Goa v. Kerala Blasters, 9 December 2017)
- Longest goal: 59 meters, Álvaro Vázquez (for Kerala Blasters v. NorthEast United, 4 February 2022)

=== Assists ===
Bold denotes players still playing in the Indian Super League.

Most assists
| Rank | Player | Assists | Apps | Ratio | Position | First assist | Last assist |
|---|---|---|---|---|---|---|---|
| 1 | (France) Hugo Boumous | 40 | 124 | 0.32 | Midfielder | 2017–18 | 2024–25 |
| 2 | (India) **Brandon Fernandes** | 29 | 145 | 0.2 | Midfielder | 2015 | 2025–26 |
| 2 | (Morocco) Ahmed Jahouh | 29 | 150 | 0.19 | Midfielder | 2017–18 | 2024–25 |
| 4 | (Fiji) Roy Krishna | 26 | 116 | 0.22 | Forward | 2019–20 | 2023–24 |
| 4 | (Scotland) Greg Stewart | 26 | 70 | 0.37 | Midfielder | 2021–22 | 2024–25 |
| 6 | (Uruguay) Adrián Luna | 23 | 75 | 0.31 | Midfielder | 2021–22 | 2024–25 |
| 7 | (India) **Liston Colaço** | 22 | 136 | 0.16 | Forward | 2021–22 | 2025–26 |
| 8 | (India) **Jerry Mawihmingthanga** | 21 | 158 | 0.13 | Forward | 2016 | 2024–25 |
| 8 | (India) **Lallianzuala Chhangte** | 21 | 181 | 0.12 | Forward | 2016 | 2024–25 |
| 8 | (India) **Manvir Singh** | 21 | 171 | 0.12 | Forward | 2018–19 | 2025–26 |
| 8 | (Spain) **Alberto Noguera** | 21 | 110 | 0.19 | Midfielder | 2020–21 | 2025–26 |

- Most Indian Super League assists in a season: 10
  - Greg Stewart (Jamshedpur, 2021–22)
  - Madih Talal (Punjab, 2023–24)

=== Goalkeepers ===
Bold denotes players still playing in the Indian Super League.

Most clean sheets
| Rank | Player | Clean Sheets | Apps | Ratio | First season | Last season |
|---|---|---|---|---|---|---|
| 1 | (India) **Vishal Kaith** | 59 | 158 | 0.37 | 2017–18 | 2025–26 |
| 2 | (India) **Gurpreet Singh Sandhu** | 57 | 177 | 0.32 | 2017–18 | 2025–26 |
| 3 | (India) **Amrinder Singh** | 51 | 194 | 0.26 | 2015 | 2025–26 |
| 4 | (India) **Rehenesh TP** | 40 | 141 | 0.28 | 2014 | 2025–26 |
| 5 | (India) **Phurba Lachenpa** | 30 | 79 | 0.38 | 2021–22 | 2025–26 |
| 5 | (India) Arindam Bhattacharya | 30 | 100 | 0.3 | 2014 | 2022–23 |
| 7 | (India) **Prabhsukhan Singh Gill** | 29 | 94 | 0.31 | 2019–20 | 2025–26 |
| 8 | (India) Subrata Pal | 28 | 95 | 0.29 | 2014 | 2021–22 |
| 9 | (India) **Mohammad Nawaz** | 21 | 95 | 0.22 | 2018–19 | 2025–26 |
| 10 | (India) Laxmikant Kattimani | 19 | 102 | 0.19 | 2014 | 2024–25 |

- Most Indian Super League clean sheets in a season: 15, Vishal Kaith (Mohun Bagan, 2024–25)

=== Disciplinary ===
- Most yellow cards for a player: 38, Harmanjot Singh Khabra
- Most red cards for a player: 4, Ahmed Jahouh
- Most fouls: 244, Ahmed Jahouh

=== Awards ===
- Most Indian Super League Golden Boot: 2
  - Coro (2017–18, 2018–19)
- Most Indian Super League Golden Glove: 2
  - Gurpreet Singh Sandhu (2018–19, 2019–20)
  - Vishal Kaith (2022–23, 2024–25)

== Match records ==
=== Scorelines ===
- Biggest home win:
  - 7–0, Goa v. Mumbai City (17 November 2015).
  - 7–0, East Bengal FC v. Mohammedan (23 March 2026)
- Biggest away win:
  - 5–0, Goa v. Jamshedpur (19 February 2020)
  - 6–1, Mumbai City v. Odisha (24 February 2021)
  - 5–0, Hyderabad v. NorthEast United (31 January 2022)
  - 5–0, Goa v. Chennaiyin (9 February 2022)
  - 6–1, Hyderabad v. NorthEast United (29 December 2022)
  - 5–0, Jamshedpur v. Hyderabad (21 December 2023)
- Biggest aggregate win: 10–1
  - 5–1, Hyderabad v. NorthEast United (13 December 2021) and 0–5, NorthEast United v. Hyderabad (31 January 2022)
- Highest scoring: 6–5, Odisha v. East Bengal (27 February 2021)
- Highest scoring draw:
  - 4–4, Odisha v. Kerala Blasters (23 February 2020)
  - 4–4, Goa v. Kerala Blasters (6 March 2022)

== Coaches ==
- Most Championships: 3, Antonio Lopez Habas (ATK, Mohun Bagan SG) – 2014, 2019–20, 2023–24
- Most League Winners Shield: 2, Sergio Lobera (Goa, Mumbai City) – 2019–20, 2020–21
- Most clubs managed: 4
  - Sergio Lobera (Goa, Mumbai City, Odisha, Mohun Bagan SG)
- Most games as a coach: 127 matches, Sergio Lobera : Goa (56),Mumbai City (23), Odisha (48)
- Longest spell as a coach: 67 matches, Ivan Vukomanović (Kerala Blasters, 17 June 2021 – 26 April 2024)
- Shortest spell as a coach (excluding caretakers): 3 matches, Miguel Ángel Portugal (Pune City, 3 – 22 October 2018)
- Oldest coach: Stuart Baxter, 67 years, 169 days (for Odisha v. Jamshedpur, 1 February 2021)
- Youngest coach: Gerard Nus, 35 years, 295 days (for NorthEast United v. Mumbai City, 21 November 2020)
- Most wins in total: 55, Sergio Lobera (Goa 29, Mumbai City 13, Odisha 13)
- Most defeats in total: 29, Antonio Lopez Habas (ATK 14, Mohun Bagan SG 9, Pune City 6)
- Most consecutive matches undefeated: 16, Des Buckingham (Mumbai City), 9 October 2022 – 27 January 2023
- Most consecutive wins: 11, Des Buckingham (Mumbai City), 9 October 2022 – 27 January 2023
- Most consecutive defeats: 8
  - Marco Balbul (NorthEast United), 8 October – 2 December 2022
  - Thangboi Singto (Hyderabad), 17 December 2023 – 27 February 2024
- Most consecutive matches without a win: 18, Thangboi Singto (Hyderabad), 30 September 2023 – 4 March 2024

== All-time Indian Super League table ==
The all-time Indian Super League table is a cumulative record of all match results, points and goals of every team that has played in the Indian Super League since its inception in 2014. The table that follows is accurate as of the end of the 2025–26 season. Teams in bold are part of the 2026–27 Indian Super League. Numbers in bold are the record (highest either positive or negative) numbers in each column. Playoff matches taken into account.

| Pos. | Club | Seasons | Pld | W | D | L | GF | GA | GD | Pts | PPM | Regular season pos. | | | | T4 | Debut | Since/Last App. | Best Regular season pos. |
| Pos. | Club | Seasons | Pld | W | D | L | GF | GA | GD | Pts | PPM | 1st | 2nd | 3rd | 4th | T4 | Debut | Since/Last App. | Best Regular season pos. |
|---|---|---|---|---|---|---|---|---|---|---|---|---|---|---|---|---|---|---|---|
| 1 | **Mumbai City** | **12** | 228 | **108** | 56 | 64 | 350 | 281 | 69 | **380** | 1.67 | **3** | 1 | 2 | | 6 | 2014 | 2014 | **1** |
| 2 | **Goa** | **12** | **234** | 104 | 62 | 68 | **406** | 308 | 98 | 374 | 1.60 | 2 | **2** | **3** | 1 | **8** | 2014 | 2014 | **1** |
| 3 | **Bengaluru** | 9 | 189 | 85 | 43 | 61 | 275 | 223 | 52 | 298 | 1.58 | 2 | | 3 | 1 | 6 | 2017–18 | 2017–18 | **1** |
| 4 | **Kerala Blasters** | **12** | 226 | 74 | 64 | 88 | 287 | 320 | −33 | 286 | 1.27 | | 1 | | **2** | 3 | 2014 | 2014 | 2 |
| 5 | **Odisha** (Note: Includes statistics from the club under its former name, Delhi Dynamos) | **12** | 223 | 73 | 64 | 86 | 325 | **358** | −33 | 283 | 1.27 | | | 1 | **2** | 3 | 2014 | 2014 | 3 |
| 6 | **Chennaiyin** | **12** | 227 | 73 | 60 | 94 | 306 | 349 | −43 | 279 | 1.23 | 1 | 1 | 1 | 1 | 4 | 2014 | 2014 | **1** |
| 7 | **Mohun Bagan** | 6 | 134 | 77 | 32 | 25 | 225 | 126 | **99** | 263 | **1.96** | 2 | 2 | 2 | | 6 | 2020–21 | 2020–21 | **1** |
| 8 | **Jamshedpur** | 9 | 178 | 67 | 47 | 64 | 235 | 239 | −4 | 248 | 1.39 | 1 | | | | 1 | 2017–18 | 2017–18 | **1** |
| 9 | **NorthEast United** | **12** | 220 | 59 | **66** | **95** | 265 | 341 | −76 | 243 | 1.10 | | | 1 | **2** | 3 | 2014 | 2014 | 3 |
| 10 | **SC Delhi** (Note: Includes statistics from the club under its former name, Hyderabad FC) | 7 | 142 | 40 | 42 | 60 | 176 | 207 | −31 | 162 | 1.14 | | **2** | | | 2 | 2019–20 | 2019–20 | 2 |
| 11 | ATK | 6 | 107 | 40 | 35 | 32 | 138 | 122 | 16 | 155 | 1.45 | | **2** | 1 | 1 | 4 | 2014 | 2019–20 | 2 |
| 12 | **East Bengal** | 6 | 119 | 31 | 32 | 56 | 146 | 180 | −34 | 125 | 1.05 | 1 | | | | 1 | 2020–21 | 2020–21 | **1** |
| 13 | Pune City | 5 | 80 | 27 | 19 | 34 | 97 | 110 | −13 | 100 | 1.25 | | | | 1 | 1 | 2014 | 2018–19 | 4 |
| 14 | **Punjab** | 3 | 59 | 20 | 14 | 25 | 80 | 85 | −5 | 74 | 1.25 | | | | | | 2023–24 | 2023–24 | 6 |
| 15 | Mohammedan | 2 | 37 | 2 | 10 | 25 | 19 | 75 | −56 | 16 | 0.43 | | | | | | 2024–25 | 2025–26 | 13 |
| 16 | **Inter Kashi** | 1 | 13 | 3 | 4 | 6 | 11 | 17 | −6 | 13 | 1.00 | | | | | | 2025–26 | 2025–26 | 10 |

League or status in 2026–27:

| 2026–27 Indian Super League clubs |
| 2026–27 Indian Football League teams |
| Defunct clubs |

== See also ==
- List of Indian football champions
- List of Indian football first tier top scorers
- List of foreign Indian Super League players
- List of Indian Super League seasons
- List of Indian Super League owners
- List of Indian Super League head coaches
- Indian Super League attendance
- List of Indian Super League hat-tricks
