= List of Indian Super League coaches =

The Indian Super League is the top tier of professional football in India. The league was formed in 2014 as a tournament until it was recognised as one of the first division leagues in 2017 with the existing I-League, later replacing it to become the only top division league since 2022. To date, there have been 79 head coaches (including interim head coaches) in charge of the 14 clubs that have played in the league.

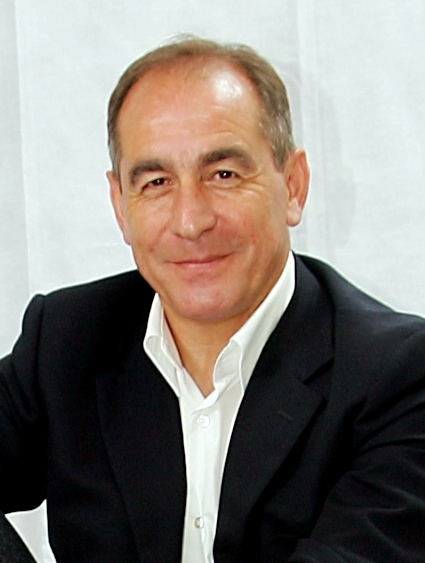
Antonio López Habas : 2x Cup and 1x Shield winner

Sergio Lobera holds the record for most matches coached in the Indian Super League with 127, which he managed from 2017 to 2021, and from 2023 to 2025. Sergio Lobera (two ISL League Shields and one ISL Cup), José Francisco Molina (one ISL League Shield and two ISL Cups) and Antonio López Habas (one ISL League Shield and two ISL Cups), who won three titles each, have been the most successful head coach in the Indian Super League. Habas have managed the most teams in the Indian Super League, having taken charge of four different clubs. Many of the coaches listed below served as caretaker coaches in the period between a coaching departure and an appointment. A few of these, however, went on to secure a permanent coaching post; for example, Khalid Jamil took over as an interim coach of NorthEast United in January 2021 and became the head coach of the team in the following season.

== Head coaches ==
The list of head coaches includes everyone who has managed clubs while they were in the Indian Super League, whether in a permanent or temporary role. Caretaker coaches are listed only when they managed the team for at least one match in that period.

The dates of appointment may fall outside the club period in the league, for example, Albert Roca was appointed as Bengaluru coach in 2016 (before the club's entry in the league in 2017) and remained in his position through the club's introduction into the league.

Key
†	Incumbent head coach
‡	Caretaker head coach
*	Present up to date as of 24 July 2025

Head coaches
Name	Nat.	Club	From	Until	Duration (days)	Years in League	Ref.
Antonio López Habas	(Spain)	ATK	1 July 2014	20 December 2015	537	2014–2015	
José Francisco Molina	(Spain)	ATK	5 May 2016	18 December 2016	227	2016	
Teddy Sheringham	(England)	ATK	14 July 2017	24 January 2018	194	2017–2018	
Ashley Westwood ‡	(England)	ATK	24 January 2018	3 March 2018	38	2018	
Robbie Keane	(Republic of Ireland)	ATK	4 March 2018	31 May 2018	88	2018	
Steve Coppell	(England)	ATK	18 June 2018	30 April 2019	316	2018–2019	
Antonio López Habas	(Spain)	ATK	3 May 2019	31 May 2020	394	2019–2020	
Albert Roca	(Spain)	Bengaluru	6 July 2016	31 May 2018	694	2017–2018	
Carles Cuadrat	(Spain)	Bengaluru	1 July 2018	6 January 2021	920	2018–2021	
Naushad Moosa ‡	(India)	Bengaluru	6 January 2021	25 February 2021	50	2021	
Marco Pezzaiuoli	(Germany)	Bengaluru	12 February 2021	8 June 2022	481	2021–2022	
Simon Grayson	(England)	Bengaluru	8 June 2022	9 December 2023	549	2022–2023	
Gerard Zaragoza	(Spain)	Bengaluru	14 December 2023	14 November 2025	701	2023–2025	
Renedy Singh	(India)	Bengaluru	14 November 2025	26 March 2026	132	2025–2026	
Pep Muñoz †	(Spain)	Bengaluru	26 March 2026	Present*	240	2026–	
Marco Materazzi	(Italy)	Chennaiyin	12 September 2014	6 March 2017	724	2014–2016	
John Gregory	(England)	Chennaiyin	3 July 2017	30 November 2019	880	2017–2019	
Owen Coyle	(Scotland)	Chennaiyin	4 December 2019	14 March 2020	101	2019–2020	
Csaba László	(Hungary)	Chennaiyin	30 August 2020	10 April 2021	223	2020–2021	
Božidar Bandović	(Montenegro)	Chennaiyin	10 July 2021	11 February 2022	216	2021–2022	
Syed Sabir Pasha ‡	(India)	Chennaiyin	11 February 2022	14 June 2022	123	2022	
Thomas Brdarić	(Germany)	Chennaiyin	14 June 2022	10 June 2023	361	2022–2023	
Owen Coyle	(Scotland)	Chennaiyin	16 July 2023	17 July 2025	732	2023–2025	
Clifford Miranda †	(India)	Chennaiyin	12 September 2025	Present*	435	2025–	
Dimitris Dimitriou †	(Cyprus)	Churchill Brothers	18 July 2026	Present*	126	2026–	
Robbie Fowler	(England)	East Bengal	9 October 2020	8 September 2021	334	2020–2021	
Manolo Díaz	(Spain)	East Bengal	8 September 2021	28 December 2021	111	2021	
Renedy Singh ‡	(India)	East Bengal	28 December 2021	14 January 2022	17	2021–2022	
Mario Rivera	(Spain)	East Bengal	1 January 2022	20 March 2022	78	2022	
Stephen Constantine	(England)	East Bengal	27 July 2022	17 April 2023	264	2022–2023	
Carles Cuadrat	(Spain)	East Bengal	25 April 2023	30 September 2024	525	2023–2024	
Óscar Bruzón	(Spain)	East Bengal	8 October 2024	4 May 2026	574	2024–2026	
Antonio López Habas †	(Spain)	East Bengal	6 July 2026	Present*	138	2026–	
Zico	(Brazil)	Goa	2 September 2014	18 December 2016	838	2014–2016	
Sergio Lobera	(Spain)	Goa	6 June 2017	1 February 2020	970	2017–2020	
Clifford Miranda ‡	(India)	Goa	3 February 2020	30 April 2020	87	2020	
Juan Ferrando	(Spain)	Goa	30 April 2020	20 December 2021	607	2020–2021	
Derrick Pereira ‡	(India)	Goa	21 December 2021	20 March 2022	89	2021–2022	
Carlos Peña	(Spain)	Goa	16 April 2022	23 April 2023	372	2022–2023	
Manolo Márquez	(Spain)	Goa	3 June 2023	18 June 2026	1082	2023–2026	
Gouramangi Singh	(India)	Goa	24 June 2026	13 November 2026	142	2026	
Ángel Viadero †	(Spain)	Goa	15 November 2026	Present*	6	2026–	
Phil Brown	(England)	Delhi (Note: SC Delhi was previously Hyderabad FC, until the club relocated and rebranded in 2025.)	29 August 2019	11 January 2020	135	2019–2020	
Mehrajuddin Wadoo ‡	(India)	Delhi	11 January 2020	24 January 2020	13	2020	
Xavier Gurri López ‡	(Spain)	Delhi	24 January 2020	1 June 2020	129	2020	
Manolo Márquez	(Spain)	Delhi	31 August 2020 (Note: Albert Roca took charge of Hyderabad on 1 June 2020, but left before the season began, on 29 August 2020.)	31 May 2023	1003	2020–2023	
Thangboi Singto	(India)	Delhi	7 July 2023	17 Dec 2024	460	2023–2024	
Shameel Chembakath ‡	(India)	Delhi	17 Dec 2024	31 May 2025	165	2024–	
Tomasz Tchórz †	(Poland)	Delhi	19 October 2025	Present*	398	2025–	
Antonio López Habas	(Spain)	Inter Kashi	25 July 2024	11 May 2026	656	2024–2026	
Abhijit Mondal ‡	(India)	Inter Kashi	11 May 2026	7 October 2026	150	2026	
Carlos Vaz Pinto †	(Portugal)	Inter Kashi	7 October 2026	Present*	45	2026–	
Steve Coppell	(England)	Jamshedpur	14 July 2017	31 May 2018	321	2017–2018	
César Ferrando	(Spain)	Jamshedpur	21 July 2018	5 April 2019	258	2018–2019	
Antonio Iriondo	(Spain)	Jamshedpur	26 July 2019	29 February 2020	218	2019–2020	
Owen Coyle	(Scotland)	Jamshedpur	7 August 2020	22 March 2022	592	2020–2022	
Aidy Boothroyd	(England)	Jamshedpur	10 July 2022	31 May 2023	325	2022–2023	
Scott Cooper	(England)	Jamshedpur	14 July 2023	29 December 2023	168	2023	
Khalid Jamil	(India)	Jamshedpur	31 December 2023	13 August 2025	591	2023–2025	
Owen Coyle	(Scotland)	Jamshedpur	24 January 2026	14 August 2026	203	2026	
David James	(England)	Kerala Blasters	20 August 2014	20 December 2014	122	2014	
Peter Taylor	(England)	Kerala Blasters	9 May 2015	28 October 2015	172	2015	
Trevor Morgan ‡	(England)	Kerala Blasters	28 October 2015	1 November 2015	4	2015	
Terry Phelan	(Republic of Ireland)	Kerala Blasters	1 November 2015	20 December 2015	57	2015	
Steve Coppell	(England)	Kerala Blasters	21 June 2016	12 July 2017	386	2016–2017	
René Meulensteen	(Netherlands)	Kerala Blasters	14 July 2017	2 January 2018	172	2017–2018	
David James	(England)	Kerala Blasters	3 January 2018	18 December 2018	349	2018	
Nelo Vingada ‡	(Portugal)	Kerala Blasters	18 January 2019	17 March 2019	58	2019	
Eelco Schattorie	(Netherlands)	Kerala Blasters	19 May 2019	22 April 2020	339	2019–2020	
Kibu Vicuña	(Spain)	Kerala Blasters	22 April 2020	17 February 2021	301	2020–2021	
Ishfaq Ahmed ‡	(India)	Kerala Blasters	17 February 2021	17 June 2021	120	2021	
Ivan Vukomanović	(Serbia)	Kerala Blasters	17 June 2021	26 April 2024	1,044	2021–2024	
Frank Dauwen ‡	(Belgium)	Kerala Blasters	5 April 2023	16 April 2023	11	2023	
Mikael Stahre	(Sweden)	Kerala Blasters	23 May 2024	16 December 2024	207	2024	
T. G. Purushothaman ‡	(India)	Kerala Blasters	17 December 2024	24 March 2025	98	2024-2025	
David Català	(Spain)	Kerala Blasters	25 March 2025	27 March 2026	368	2025-2026	
Ashley Westwood †	(England)	Kerala Blasters	27 March 2026	Present*	239	2026-	
Andrey Chernyshov	(Russia)	Mohammedan SC	29 August 2023	29 January 2025	520	2024–2025	
Mehrajuddin Wadoo	(India)	Mohammedan SC	13 February 2025	19 May 2026	460	2025-2026	
Antonio López Habas	(Spain)	Mohun Bagan SG	1 July 2020	18 December 2021	535	2020–2021	
Juan Ferrando	(Spain)	Mohun Bagan SG	20 December 2021	3 January 2024	744	2021–2024	
Antonio López Habas	(Spain)	Mohun Bagan SG	3 January 2024	4 May 2024	123	2024–2024	
José Francisco Molina	(Spain)	Mohun Bagan SG	11 June 2024	26 November 2025	533	2024–2025	
Sergio Lobera	(Spain)	Mohun Bagan SG	26 November 2025	16 June 2026	203	2025–2026	
Panagiotis Dilmperis †	(Greece)	Mohun Bagan SG	7 July 2026	Present*	137	2026–	
Peter Reid	(England)	Mumbai City	4 September 2014	20 December 2014	107	2014	
Nicolas Anelka	(France)	Mumbai City	3 July 2015	20 December 2015	170	2015	
Alexandre Guimarães	(Costa Rica)	Mumbai City	19 April 2016	14 August 2018	847	2016–2018	
Jorge Costa	(Portugal)	Mumbai City	14 August 2018	5 March 2020	569	2018–2020	
Sergio Lobera	(Spain)	Mumbai City	12 October 2020	8 October 2021	361	2020–2021	
Des Buckingham	(England)	Mumbai City	8 October 2021	16 November 2023	769	2021–2023	
Anthony Fernandes ‡	(India)	Mumbai City	16 November 2023	8 December 2023	22	2023	
Petr Kratky	(Czech Republic)	Mumbai City	9 December 2023	10 June 2026	914	2023–2026	
Manolo Márquez	(Spain)	Mumbai City	18 July 2026	6 November 2026	111	2026	
Ashvir Singh Johal †	(England)	Mumbai City	14 November 2026	Present*	7	2026–	
Ricki Herbert	(New Zealand)	NorthEast United	19 August 2014	20 December 2014	123	2014	
César Farías	(Venezuela)	NorthEast United	1 July 2015	2 December 2015	154	2015	
Nelo Vingada	(Portugal)	NorthEast United	16 July 2016 (Note: Sérgio Farias took charge of NorthEast United on 13 May 2016, but left before the season began, on 9 July 2016.)	4 December 2016	141	2016	
João de Deus	(Portugal)	NorthEast United	17 July 2017	2 January 2018	169	2017–2018	
Avram Grant	(Israel)	NorthEast United	2 January 2018	15 March 2018	72	2018	
Eelco Schattorie	(Netherlands)	NorthEast United	17 August 2018	11 March 2019	206	2018–2019	
Robert Jarni	(Croatia)	NorthEast United	5 August 2019	10 February 2020	189	2019–2020	
Khalid Jamil ‡	(India)	NorthEast United	10 February 2020	25 August 2020	197	2020	
Gerard Nus	(Spain)	NorthEast United	25 August 2020	12 January 2021	140	2020–2021	
Khalid Jamil	(India)	NorthEast United	12 January 2021 (Note: Jamil served as caretaker coach until 23 October 2021, when he was appointed as head coach.)	28 May 2022	501	2021–2022	
Marco Balbul	(Israel)	NorthEast United	11 August 2022	8 December 2022	119	2022	
Vincenzo Alberto Annese	(Italy)	NorthEast United	8 December 2022	28 february 2023	82	2022–2023	
Juan Pedro Benali †	(Spain)	NorthEast United	22 May 2023	Present*	1674	2023–	
Harm van Veldhoven	(Netherlands)	Odisha (Note: Odisha FC was previously Delhi Dynamos, until the club relocated and rebranded in 2019.)	30 July 2014	5 January 2015	159	2014–2015	
Roberto Carlos	(Brazil)	Odisha	3 July 2015	20 December 2015	170	2015	
Gianluca Zambrotta	(Italy)	Odisha	5 July 2016	14 June 2017	344	2016–2017	
Miguel Ángel Portugal	(Spain)	Odisha	29 June 2017	2 May 2018	307	2017–2018	
Josep Gombau	(Spain)	Odisha	2 August 2018	18 March 2020	594	2018–2020	
Stuart Baxter	(Scotland)	Odisha	19 June 2020	2 February 2021	228	2020–2021	
Gerry Peyton ‡	(Republic of Ireland)	Odisha	3 February 2021	20 February 2021	17	2021	
Steven Dias ‡	(India)	Odisha	23 February 2021	20 July 2021	147	2021	
Kiko Ramírez	(Spain)	Odisha	20 July 2021	14 January 2022	178	2021–2022	
Kino García ‡	(Spain)	Odisha	14 January 2022	8 June 2022	145	2022	
Josep Gombau	(Spain)	Odisha	8 June 2022	18 March 2023	283	2022–2023	
Sergio Lobera	(Spain)	Odisha	17 May 2023	26 November 2025	924	2023–2025	
T. G. Purushothaman †	(India)	Odisha	5 February 2026	Present*	289	2026-	
Franco Colomba	(Italy)	Pune City	22 July 2014	20 December 2014	151	2014	
David Platt	(England)	Pune City	2 June 2015	20 December 2015	201	2015	
Antonio López Habas	(Spain)	Pune City	25 April 2016	15 September 2017	508	2016–2017	
Ranko Popović	(Serbia)	Pune City	25 September 2017	31 May 2018	248	2017–2018	
Miguel Ángel Portugal	(Spain)	Pune City	1 June 2018 (Note: Marcos Paquetá took charge of Pune City on 1 June 2018, but left before the season began, on 29 June 2018.)	26 October 2018	147	2018	
Pradhyum Reddy ‡	(India)	Pune City	26 October 2018	24 December 2018	59	2018	
Phil Brown	(England)	Pune City	24 December 2018	27 August 2019	246	2018–2019	
Staikos Vergetis	(Greece)	Punjab	8 August 2022	13 June 2024	676	2023–2024	
Panagiotis Dilmperis	(Greece)	Punjab	29 June 2024	7 July 2026	708	2024–2026	
Pavlos Dermitzakis †	(Greece)	Punjab	18 July 2026	Present*	126	2026–	

=== By club ===
Club	Total
ATK	7
Bengaluru	8
Chennaiyin	9
Churchill Brothers	1
East Bengal	8
Goa	9
Delhi	7
Inter Kashi	3
Jamshedpur	8
Kerala Blasters	17
Mohammedan	2
Mohun Bagan SG	6
Mumbai City	10
NorthEast United	13
Odisha	13
Punjab	3
Pune City	7

=== By nationality ===
Country	Total appointments	Total individuals
Spain	41	25
England	22	17
India	22	16
Portugal	5	4
Scotland	5	2
Greece	4	3
Italy	4	4
Netherlands	4	3
Ireland	3	3
Brazil	2	2
Germany	2	2
Israel	2	2
Serbia	2	2
Belgium	1	1
Costa Rica	1	1
Croatia	1	1
Cyprus	1	1
Czech Republic	1	1
France	1	1
Hungary	1	1
Montenegro	1	1
New Zealand	1	1
Poland	1	1
Russia	1	1
Sweden	1	1
Venezuela	1	1
Total	131	98

== Most matches coached in the Indian Super League ==
Current Indian Super League head coaches and their current clubs are shown in bold.

As of matches played 31 January 2026

Rank	Head coach	Nat.	Record					First	Last	Club(s)
Rank	Head coach	Nat.	P	W	D	L	Win %	First	Last	Club(s)
1	**Sergio Lobera**	(Spain)	127	63	32	32	49.61	2017	2025	Goa (56); Mumbai City (23); **Odisha** (48); **Mohun Bagan SG** (0)
2	**Manolo Márquez**	(Spain)	116	60	34	22	51.72	2020	2025	Hyderabad (65); Goa (51)
3	**Antonio López Habas**	(Spain)	109	52	28	29	47.71	2014	2024	ATK (54); Mohun Bagan SG (41); Pune City (14); Inter Kashi (0)
4	Owen Coyle	(Scotland)	104	43	23	38	41.35	2019	2024	Jamshedpur (42); Chennaiyin (38)
5	Juan Ferrando	(Spain)	78	35	26	17	44.87	2020	2023	Mohun Bagan SG (50); Goa (28)
6	Carles Cuadrat	(Spain)	78	31	18	29	39.74	2018	2024	Bengaluru (50); East Bengal (28)
7	Khalid Jamil	(India)	71	26	15	30	36.62	2020	2025	North East (34); Jamshedpur (37)
8	Ivan Vukomanović	(Serbia)	67	30	13	24	44.78	2021	2024	Kerala Blasters
9	Josep Gombau	(Spain)	57	20	13	24	35.09	2018	2023	Odisha
10	Steve Coppell	(England)	53	20	16	17	37.74	2016	2019	ATK (18); Jamshedpur (18); Kerala Blasters (17)
Minimum 50 matches managed

== Title-winning head coaches ==
Rank	Head coach	Nat.	Titles	Club(s)	Seasons	
Rank	Head coach	Nat.	Titles	Club(s)	Premierships	Championships
1	Sergio Lobera	(Spain)	3	Goa, Mumbai City	2019–20, 2020–21	2021
1	Antonio López Habas	(Spain)	3	ATK, Mohun Bagan SG	2023–24	2014, 2020
1	José Francisco Molina	(Spain)	3	ATK, Mohun Bagan SG	2024–25	2016, 2025
2	Des Buckingham	(England)	1	Mumbai City	2022–23	
2	Owen Coyle	(Scotland)	1	Jamshedpur	2021–22	–
2	Juan Ferrando	(Spain)	1	Mohun Bagan SG	–	2023
2	Manolo Márquez	(Spain)	1	Hyderabad	–	2022
2	Carles Cuadrat	(Spain)	1	Bengaluru	–	2019
2	John Gregory	(England)	1	Chennaiyin	–	2018
2	Marco Materazzi	(Italy)	1	Chennaiyin	–	2015

== See also ==
- Indian Super League attendance
- List of foreign Indian Super League players
- List of Indian Super League club owners
- List of Indian Super League hat-tricks
- List of Indian Super League records and statistics
- List of Indian Super League seasons
