= 2014 Delhi Dynamos FC season =

2014 season of Delhi Dynamos FC

Delhi Dynamos
2014 season
- Chairman: Sameer Manchanda
- Head Coach: Harm van Veldhoven
- Stadium: Jawaharlal Nehru Stadium
- Indian Super League: 5th
- Top goalscorer: League: Gustavo Marmentini (5); All: Gustavo Marmentini (5)
- Average home league attendance: 15,713
Home colours	Away colours

The 2014 Delhi Dynamos FC season was the first ever season in the history of the Delhi Dynamos, a franchise in the inaugural season of the Indian Super League. For the first season the Dynamos announced a partnership with Feyenoord, who helped the Indian club assemble their technical staff and squad.

The Delhi Dynamos began their season on 14 October with a 0–0 draw at home against Pune City. Despite only losing four of their fourteen matches during the 2014 season, the Delhi Dynamos failed to qualify for the finals by only a single point.

== Background ==
=== Signings ===
==== Indian draft ====
Round	Position	Player	I-League club
1	MF	(India) Francis Fernandes	Salgaocar
2	DF	(India) Robert Lalthlamuana	East Bengal
3	DF	(India) Naoba Singh	East Bengal
4	MF	(India) Shylo Malsawmtluanga	East Bengal
5	DF	(India) Shouvik Ghosh	Mohun Bagan
6	MF	(India) Souvik Chakraborty	Mohun Bagan
7	DF	(India) Munmun Lugun	Rangdajied United
8	MF	(India) Adil Khan	Mohun Bagan
9	MF	(India) Manish Bhargav	Mohun Bagan
10	DF	(India) Govin Singh	Shillong Lajong
11	GK	(India) Jagroop Singh	Eagles (2nd Division)
12	MF	(India) Steven Dias	Churchill Brothers
13	DF	(India) Anwar Ali	Mumbai
14	FW	(India) Manandeep Singh	Rangdajied United

==== International draft ====
Round	Position	Player	Last Club
1	FW	(Denmark) Mads Junker	(Belgium) KV Mechelen
2	FW	(Denmark) Morten Skoubo	(Denmark) OB
3	MF	(Spain) Bruno	(Spain) Girona
4	FW	(Brazil) Gustavo Marmentini	(Brazil) Atlético Paranaense
5	GK	(Czech Republic) Marek Čech	(Czech Republic) Sparta Prague
6	MF	(Czech Republic) Pavel Eliáš	(Czech Republic) Baumit Jablonec
7	MF	(Portugal) Dinis	(Portugal) Vitória

==== Other signings ====
No.	Position	Player	Last club	Date	Ref
4	DF	(Belgium) Wim Raymaekers	(Belgium) OH Leuven	13 August 2014	
1	GK	(Belgium) Kristof Van Hout	(Belgium) Genk	19 August 2014	
10	MF	(Italy) Alessandro Del Piero	(Australia) Sydney FC	29 August 2014	
3	DF	(Netherlands) Stijn Houben	(Netherlands) HBS	8 September 2014	
6	MF	(Netherlands) Hans Mulder	(Netherlands) NEC	8 September 2014	

== Pre-season ==
13 September 2014 Friendly	Delhi Dynamos	3–0	Garhwal FC
		Report

22 September 2014 Friendly	Delhi Dynamos	9–0	Hindustan
		Report

25 September 2014 Friendly	Delhi Dynamos	7–0	Mohammedan
		Report

1 October 2014 Friendly	Delhi Dynamos	2–0 (50 minutes)	Pune
		Report

== Indian Super League ==
14 October 2014 1	Delhi Dynamos	0–0	Pune City	Delhi
19:00 IST		Report		Stadium: Jawaharlal Nehru Stadium; Attendance: 16,500; Referee: Pranjal Banerji

19 October 2014 2	Atlético de Kolkata	1–1	Delhi Dynamos	Kolkata
16:30 IST	Jofre 49' (pen.)	Report	Eliáš 74'	Stadium: Salt Lake Stadium; Attendance: 55,793; Referee: Santosh Kumar

26 October 2014 3	Delhi Dynamos	4–1	Chennaiyin	Delhi
19:00 IST	Raymaekers 1'; Junker 21'; Bruno 79' (pen.); Marmentini 90+3'	Report	Elano 68'	Stadium: Jawaharlal Nehru Stadium; Attendance: 13,000; Referee: Tejas Nagvenkar

29 October 2014 4	Delhi Dynamos	0–0	NorthEast United	Delhi
19:00 IST		Report		Stadium: Jawaharlal Nehru Stadium; Attendance: 16,500; Referee: Pratap Singh

1 November 2014 5	FC Goa	2–1	Delhi Dynamos	Margao
19:00 IST	Raja 73'; Özbey 90+3'	Report	Junker 7'	Stadium: Fatorda Stadium; Attendance: 17,563; Referee: Dave Gantar

5 November 2014 6	Mumbai City	1–0	Delhi Dynamos	Mumbai
19:00 IST	Anelka 59'	Report		Stadium: DY Patil Stadium; Attendance: 18,197; Referee: Pranjal Banerji

9 November 2014 7	Kerala Blasters	0–0	Delhi Dynamos	Kochi
19:00 IST		Report		Stadium: Jawaharlal Nehru Stadium; Attendance: 34,657; Referee: Pranjal Banerji

13 November 2014 8	Delhi Dynamos	1–4	Goa	Delhi
19:00 IST	Marmentini 73' (pen.)	Report	Bengelloun 18', 48'; Pires 53' (pen.); Özbey 60'	Stadium: Jawaharlal Nehru Stadium; Attendance: 15,697; Referee: Arumughan Rowan

16 November 2014 9	Delhi Dynamos	0–1	Kerala Blasters	Delhi
19:00 IST		Report	Orji 61'	Stadium: Jawaharlal Nehru Stadium; Attendance: 17,853; Referee: Jarred Gillett

24 October 2014 10	NorthEast United	1–2	Delhi Dynamos	Guwahati
19:00 IST	Mtonga 80'	Report	Marmentini 6'; Mulder 14'	Stadium: Indira Gandhi Athletic Stadium; Attendance: 26,749; Referee: Ravshan Irmatov

28 November 2014 11	Delhi Dynamos	4–1	Mumbai City	Delhi
19:00 IST	Mulder 44'; Junker 50'; Marmentini 60'; Bhargav 90+3'	Report	Yadav 86'	Stadium: Jawaharlal Nehru Stadium; Attendance: 14,643; Referee: C.R. Srikrishna

2 December 2014 12	Delhi Dynamos	0–0	Atlético de Kolkata	Delhi
19:00 IST		Report		Stadium: Jawaharlal Nehru Stadium; Attendance: 16,300; Referee: Arumughan Rowan

6 December 2014 13	Pune City	0–1	Delhi Dynamos	Pune
19:00 IST		Report	Marmentini 88'	Stadium: Balewadi Sports Complex; Attendance: 8,212; Referee: Ranjit Bakshi

9 December 2014 14	Chennaiyin	2–2	Delhi Dynamos FC	Chennai
16:30 IST	Pelissari 16'; Lalpekhlua 28'	Report	Del Piero 53'; Mulder 88'	Stadium: Jawaharlal Nehru Stadium; Attendance: 20,446; Referee: Pranjal Banerji

=== Table ===
Pos	Team	Pld	W	D	L	GF	GA	GD	Pts	Qualification
3	Atlético de Kolkata (C)	14	4	7	3	16	13	+3	19	Advance to ISL Play-offs
4	Kerala Blasters	14	5	4	5	9	11	−2	19	Advance to ISL Play-offs
5	Delhi Dynamos	14	4	6	4	16	14	+2	18	
6	Pune City	14	4	4	6	12	17	−5	16	
7	Mumbai City	14	4	4	6	12	21	−9	16	

Source: Soccerway
Rules for classification: 1) points; 2) goal difference; 3) number of goals scored
(C) Champions

=== Results summary ===
Overall								Home						Away					
Pld	W	D	L	GF	GA	GD	Pts	W	D	L	GF	GA	GD	W	D	L	GF	GA	GD
14	4	6	4	16	14	+2	18	2	3	2	9	7	+2	2	3	2	7	7	0

Source: http://www.indiansuperleague.com/delhi-dynamos-fc/schedules-results

== Player statistics ==
Season stats
#	Position	Player	GP	G
1	GK	(Belgium) Kristof Van Hout	14	0
2	DF	(India) Govin Singh	1	0
3	DF	(Netherlands) Stijn Houben	7	0
4	DF	(Belgium) Wim Raymaekers	8	1
5	DF	(India) Anwar Ali	14	0
6	MF	(Netherlands) Hans Mulder	13	3
7	FW	(Denmark) Morten Skoubo	8	0
8	MF	(India) Adil Khan	7	0
9	FW	(Denmark) Mads Junker	14	3
10	FW	(Italy) Alessandro Del Piero	10	1
11	MF	(India) Francis Fernandes	11	0
13	MF	(Czech Republic) Pavel Eliáš	5	1
14	MF	(Portugal) Henrique Dinis	6	0
15	MF	(Spain) Bruno Herrero Arias	10	1
16	MF	(Brazil) Gustavo Marmentini	13	5
17	FW	(India) Manandeep Singh	2	0
18	DF	(India) Munmun Lugun	1	0
19	DF	(India) Robert Lalthlamuana	3	0
20	MF	(India) Souvik Chakraborty	7	0
21	GK	(India) Jagroop Singh	0	0
22	DF	(India) Naoba Singh	5	0
23	MF	(India) Steven Dias	7	0
24	GK	(Czech Republic) Marek Čech	0	0
26	DF	(India) Shouvik Ghosh	13	0
28	MF	(India) Shylo Malsawmtluanga	13	0
34	MF	(India) Manish Bhargav	3	1

== See also ==
- 2014–15 in Indian football
