= List of Indian Super League club owners =

Professional football club owners

This is a list of individuals, groups of individuals, and companies who have or had owned and operated a professional football club competing in Indian Super League. Some owners have significant interest in the club, estimated net worth and source of wealth.

== Current clubs ==
The following is a list of current Indian Super League club owners:

Club	Owner(s)	Estimated combined net worth	Source of wealth
Bengaluru	(India) JSW Group	$2.7B	Steel and energy
Chennaiyin	(India) Abhishek Bachchan (India) MS Dhoni (India) Vita Dani	$2.74B	Asian Paints; Jaipur Pink Panthers; Investments
Churchill Brothers	(India) Churchill Brothers Sports Club Private Limited (India) Churchill Alemao		Alemao Family Investments; Supporter's Trust
Delhi	(India) Vijay Madduri (India) Varun Tripuraneni (India) Rana Daggubati		B.C Jindal Group; Investments
East Bengal	(India) Emami Group (India) East Bengal Club Pvt. Ltd.	$2.2B	Emami; Supporter's trust
Goa	(India) Jaydev Mody (65%) (India) Akshay Tandon (23%) (India) Virat Kohli (12%)	$131m	Delta Corp; Investments
Inter Kashi	(India) RDB Group of Companies		RDB Group
Kerala Blasters	(United Arab Emirates) Al Fursan Sports Investment (Sheikh Ahmad bin Faisal Al Qasimi)	$15B	Al Qasimi royal family of Sharjah, UAE
Mohun Bagan	(India) Kolkata Games & Sports Pvt. Ltd. (80%) (India) Mohun Bagan Athletic Club Pvt. Ltd. (20%)	$3B	RPSG Group; Investments; Supporter's trust
Mumbai City	(India) Ranbir Kapoor (50%) (India) Bimal Parekh (50%)	$2.85B	Sovereign wealth Investments
NorthEast United	(India) John Abraham (95%) (India) Jaya Balan (5%)		JA Entertainment
Odisha	(United States) GMS Inc.	$1.86B	Shipping
Punjab	(India) RoundGlass Sports Pvt. Ltd.		Investments; Trusts

== Former clubs ==
This list features all the former clubs that featured in the Indian Super League in the past:

Previous club(s)	Owners	Status
Pune City	(India) Rajesh Wadhawan Group (India) Arjun Kapoor (India) Hrithik Roshan	Dissolved
ATK	(India) Kolkata Games & Sports Pvt. Ltd.	Dissolved
Jamshedpur	(India) Tata Steel	Dissolved
Mohammedan	(India) Bunkerhill Pvt. Ltd. (India) Shrachi Sports (India) Mohammedan Sporting Club Pvt. Ltd.	Relegated
Diamond Harbour	(India) Abhishek Banerjee	Disqualified

== See also ==
- List of Indian Super League records and statistics
- List of Indian Super League seasons
- List of foreign Indian Super League players
- List of Indian Super League head coaches
- Indian Super League attendance
- List of Indian Super League hat-tricks
