= Indian Super League attendance =

Statistics of attendance in the Indian Super League

The Indian Super League is the top football league in India. Founded in 2014, the 2015 season saw an average attendance of 27,111 between the eight teams, higher than the average from the league's inaugural season in 2014.

== Highest Attended Matches ==
Rank	Home team	Score	Away team	Attendance	Date	Stadium
1	Atlético de Kolkata	2–1	Chennaiyin FC	68,340	16 December 2015	Vivekananda Yuba Bharati Krirangan
2	Atlético de Kolkata	3–0	Mumbai City FC	65,000	12 October 2014	Vivekananda Yuba Bharati Krirangan
3	Mohun Bagan	2–0	East Bengal	62,542	29 October 2022	Vivekananda Yuba Bharati Krirangan
4	Mohun Bagan	1–1	East Bengal	62,207	17 May 2026	Vivekananda Yuba Bharati Krirangan
5	Kerala Blasters	0–1	Delhi Dynamos	62,087	18 October 2015	Jawaharlal Nehru Stadium (Kochi)
6	Mohun Bagan	2–0	Odisha FC	62,007	28 April 2024	Vivekananda Yuba Bharati Krirangan
7	Mohun Bagan	1-3	Mumbai City FC	62,007	4 May 2024	Vivekananda Yuba Bharati Krirangan
8	Mohun Bagan	2–1	Mumbai City FC	61,777	15 April 2024	Vivekananda Yuba Bharati Krirangan
9	Mohun Bagan	2–0	FC Goa	61,591	08 March 2025	Vivekananda Yuba Bharati Krirangan
10	Kerala Blasters	0–0	Mumbai City FC	61,483	10 October 2015	Jawaharlal Nehru Stadium (Kochi)
11	Kerala Blasters	0–1	Chennaiyin FC	61,323	30 November 2014	Jawaharlal Nehru Stadium (Kochi)

== Season averages ==
Season	Total gate	Games	Average	High avg.	Team	Low avg.	Team	Ref.
2014	15,90,292	61	24,711	48,897	Kerala Blasters	5,895	Pune City	
2015	16,59,808	61	27,111	46,111	Kerala Blasters	4,985	Pune City	
2016	12,60,207	61	21,003	52,008	Kerala Blasters	5,396	Mumbai City	
2017–18	13,99,407	95	15,047	32,047	Kerala Blasters	7,449	Mumbai City	
2018–19	12,31,304	95	13,155	20,016	Jamshedpur	9,981	Mumbai City	
2019–20	12,26,912	95	13,052	25,847	ATK	5,240	Mumbai City	
2020–21	Played behind closed doors, due to COVID-19 pandemic							
2021–22	Played behind closed doors, due to COVID-19 pandemic							
2022–23	14,91,798	117	12,756	28,207	Mohun Bagan	2,457	NorthEast United	
2023–24	16,86,631	139	12,311 (Note: excluding matches played behind closed doors)	37,058	Mohun Bagan	2,173	Hyderabad	
2024–25	19,34,882	163	11,870	37,465	Mohun Bagan	1,517	Hyderabad	

== ISL attendance compared to the other leagues ==
As of

League	Sport	Country	Season	Teams	Games	Total attendance	Average attendance	Ref(s)
National Football League	American football	United States	2016	32	256	17,788,671	69,487	
Bundesliga	Association football	Germany	2016–17	18	306	12,702,427	41,511	
Premier League	Association football	England (1 club in Wales)	2016–17	20	380	13,612,316	35,822	
Australian Football League	Australian rules football	Australia	2017	18	207	7,287,880	35,207	
Big Bash League	Cricket	Australia	2016–17	8	35	1,053,997	30,114	
Major League Baseball	Baseball	United States (1 club in Canada)	2017	30	2,419	72,670,423	30,042	
Nippon Professional Baseball	Baseball	Japan	2017	12	858	25,139,463 ^{[C]}	29,300	
Liga MX	Association football	Mexico	2015–16	18	153	4,253,406	27,800	
La Liga	Association football	Spain	2016–17	20	378	10,470,781	27,700	
Indian Premier League	Cricket	India	2017	8	60	1,567,543	26,126	1
Indian Super League	Association football	India	2015	8	61	1,653,808	27,111	
Canadian Football League	Canadian football	Canada	2016	9	81	2,003,714	24,691	
Chinese Super League	Association football	China	2016	16	240	5,798,135	24,159	
Serie A	Association football	Italy	2016–17	20	380	8,422,378	22,164	
Major League Soccer	Association football	United States/Canada	2017	22	374	8,269,919	22,112	
Bangladesh Premier League	Cricket	Bangladesh	2015–16	6	34	742,000	21,824	1
2. Bundesliga	Association football	Germany	2016–17	18	306	6,650,993	21,735	
Argentine Primera División	Association football	Argentina	2014–15	20	90	1,923,700	21,374	
Ligue 1	Association football	France (1 club in Monaco)	2016–17	20	378	7,948,990	21,029	
EFL Championship	Association football	England	2016–17	24	552	11,105,922	20,119	
Super Rugby	Rugby union	New Zealand (5 teams); South Africa (5 teams); Australia (5 teams)	2015	15	125	1,034,826	19,163	
Eredivisie	Association football	Netherlands	2016–17	18	306	5,841,521	19,094	
J1 League	Association football	Japan	2017	18	306	5,778,178	18,883	
Argentine Primera División	Association football	Argentina	2016–17	30	450	7,261,650	16,137	
National Rugby League	Rugby league	Australia (1 club in New Zealand)	2016	16	201	3,228,623	16,063	
Campeonato Brasileiro Série A	Association football	Brazil	2016	20	378	5,975,926	15,809	
Aviva Premier	Rugby union	England	2016–17	12	135	2,033,805	15,065	

== See also ==
- List of Indian Super League stadiums
- List of Indian Super League records and statistics
- List of Indian Super League seasons
- List of Indian Super League owners
- List of Indian Super League head coaches
- List of foreign Indian Super League players
- List of Indian Super League hat-tricks
