= Henrique Dinis =

Portuguese footballer (born 1990)

Personal information
- Full name: Henrique Dinis Oliveira Dias
- Date of birth: 21 January 1990 (age 36)
- Place of birth: Monção, Portugal
- Height: 1.83 m (6 ft 0 in)
- Position: Defensive midfielder

Youth career
- 2001–2003: Quinta da Oliveira
- 2003–2004: Monção
- 2004–2009: Vitória Guimarães

Senior career*
Years	Team	Apps	(Gls)
2009–2014	Vitória Guimarães	1	(0)
2010	→ Gondomar (loan)	9	(0)
2010–2011	→ Lousada (loan)	8	(0)
2011	→ Deportivo B (loan)	11	(0)
2011–2012	→ Trofense (loan)	13	(0)
2012–2014	Vitória Guimarães B	4	(0)
2014	Delhi Dynamos	6	(0)
2015	Istra 1961	8	(0)
2016–2017	Cinfães	0	(0)
2017–2018	Torcatense	8	(0)
Total		68	(0)

International career
2005–2006	Portugal U16	11	(1)
2006–2007	Portugal U17	6	(1)
2007–2008	Portugal U18	4	(0)
2008–2009	Portugal U19	5	(0)
2010	Portugal U20	1	(0)
2011	Portugal U21	1	(0)
- * Club domestic league appearances and goals

Henrique Dinis Oliveira Dias (born 21 January 1990), known as Dinis, is a Portuguese former professional footballer who played as a defensive midfielder.

== Club career ==
Born in Monção, Viana do Castelo District, Dinis joined Vitória SC's youth system at the age of 14. His Primeira Liga input with the first team consisted of 13 minutes in a 3–2 home win against Académica de Coimbra, on 23 May 2009; previously, in September 2007, the 17-year-old had signed his first professional contract.

In the following four years, whilst serving as many loans, Dinis could only total 41 games for Gondomar SC, A.D. Lousada (both in the third division), Deportivo de La Coruña B (Spanish Segunda División B) and C.D. Trofense (Segunda Liga). Additionally, in both his country's second and third tiers, he played just four matches for Guimarães' reserves over the course of two seasons.

In August 2014, Dinis signed with Delhi Dynamos FC from the Indian Super League. His maiden appearance in the competition took place on 1 November, as he played the second half of the 2–1 away loss to FC Goa.

Dinis started the 2014–15 campaign with Croatian club NK Istra 1961. He made his competitive debut on 20 February 2015 in a 2–1 defeat at NK Slaven Belupo where came on as a second-half substitute for Neven Vukman, being released in mid-October by mutual consent after appearing in nine matches in all competitions.

== International career ==
Dinis earned 28 caps for Portugal at youth level. His only match with the under-21s occurred on 9 February 2011, when he featured 45 minutes in a 3–1 friendly win over Sweden.

== Personal life ==
On 26 June 2014, Dinis earned praise in Portugal from both the media and non-governmental organizations after saving the lives of two Spanish fishermen who were drowning in the Minho river.

== Career statistics ==
As of 5 October 2015

Appearances and goals by club, season and competition
Club	Season	League			Cup		Continental		Total	
Club	Season	Division	Apps	Goals	Apps	Goals	Apps	Goals	Apps	Goals
Vitória Guimarães	2008–09	Primeira Liga	1	0	0	0	—		1	0
Vitória Guimarães	2009–10	Primeira Liga	0	0	0	0	—		0	0
Vitória Guimarães	2011–12	Primeira Liga	0	0	0	0	0	0	0	0
Vitória Guimarães	2012–13	Primeira Liga	0	0	0	0	—		0	0
Vitória Guimarães	2013–14	Primeira Liga	0	0	0	0	—		0	0
Vitória Guimarães	Total		1	0	0	0	0	0	1	0
Gondomar (loan)	2009–10	Segunda Divisão	9	0	0	0	—		9	0
Lousada (loan)	2010–11	Segunda Divisão	8	0	0	0	—		8	0
Deportivo B (loan)	2010–11	Segunda División B	11	0	—		—		11	0
Trofense (loan)	2011–12	Segunda Liga	13	0	1	0	—		14	0
Delhi Dynamos	2014	Indian Super League	6	0	—		—		6	0
Istra 1961	2014–15	Croatian Football League	8	0	1	0	—		9	0
Career total			56	0	2	0	0	0	58	0
