= Pavel Eliáš =

Czech footballer

Personal information
- Date of birth: 26 November 1986 (age 39)
- Place of birth: Prague, Czechoslovakia
- Height: 1.84 m (6 ft 1/2 in)
- Position: Midfielder

Team information
- Current team: SC Ritzing
- Number: 15

Youth career
- 1991–1996: Čechie Karlín
- 1996–2005: Slavia Prague

Senior career*
| Years | Team | Apps | (Gls) |
| 2005–2006 | Slavia Prague | 3 | (0) |
| 2006–2014 | FK Jablonec 97 | 135 | (8) |
| 2014–2015 | Delhi Dynamos FC | 5 | (1) |
| 2015 | SK Dynamo České Budějovice | 8 | (0) |
| 2015 | AIK Stockholm U21 | 1 | (0) |
| 2016–2018 | SC Ritzing | 21 | (0) |
| 2018- | USV Oed/Zeillern | | |
- * Club domestic league appearances and goals as of 7 January 2023

Pavel Eliáš (born 26 November 1986) is a footballer from Czech Republic playing currently for USV Oed/Zeillern.
