= Stijn Houben =

Dutch footballer

Personal information
- Full name: Stijn Houben
- Date of birth: 5 April 1995 (age 31)
- Place of birth: Maastricht, Netherlands
- Height: 1.86 m (6 ft 1 in)
- Position: Centre back

Youth career
- 2001–2012: HBS
- 2012–2014: Feyenoord

Senior career*
Years	Team	Apps	(Gls)
2010–2012	HBS	10	(0)
2014	→ Delhi Dynamos (loan)	7	(0)
2015–2017	HBS	20	(0)
2017–2021	VOC	17	(0)
- * Club domestic league appearances and goals as of 18 March 2021

Stijn Houben (born 5 April 1995) is a Dutch retired footballer who last played for Hoofdklasse club VOC as a central defender.

== Club career ==
Houben started his career at HBS-Craeyenhout, one of the Netherlands' oldest clubs and at that time playing in the Topklasse, the third level of Dutch football. He made his senior debuts for the club in 2010, aged only 15, and shortly after moved to Feyenoord, eventually returning to the youth setup.

Houben was also called up three times by first team coach Ronald Koeman, and made his first team debut in a friendly against SBV Excelsior in October 2013. He was also an important defensive unit for the under-19's, winning both FA Cup and Supercup, against fierce rivals PSV Eindhoven.

In July 2014 Houben moved abroad for the first time of his career, signing a contract with Indian Super League outfit Delhi Dynamos FC. He played his first match as a professional on 1 November, starting and being booked in a 1–2 away loss against FC Goa.

In January 2015, Houben returned to HBS and resumed his studies in economics and business economics at Erasmus University Rotterdam. In 2017, he started playing for VOC. He retired in summer 2021.

== Honours ==
Feyenoord

- KNVB Cup U19: 2013–14
- Johan Cruijff Shield U19: 2013–14
