= Thangboi Singto =

Indian football manager

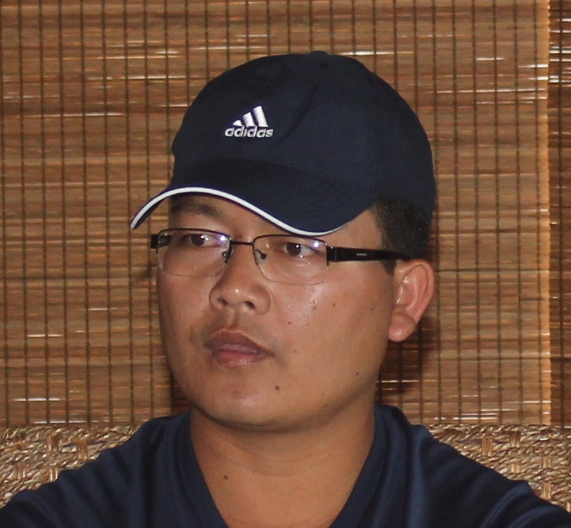
- Singto at a pre-match press conference as manager of Shillong Lajong in 2013

Personal information
- Full name: Thangboi Singto
- Date of birth: 14 June 1974 (age 52)
- Place of birth: Churachandpur, Manipur, India

Team information
- Current team: Kerala Blasters (head of football development)

Managerial career
- Years: Team
- 2013–2017: Shillong Lajong
- 2014-2017: Northeast United (assistant)
- 2017–2018: Kerala Blasters (assistant)
- 2019–2022: Odisha (assistant)
- 2022–2023: Hyderabad (assistant)
- 2023–2025: Hyderabad
- 2025–2026: East Bengal (Head of Football Operations)
- 2026–: Kerala Blasters (Head of Football Development)

Thangboi Singto (born 14 June 1974) is an Indian professional football manager who currently works as the head of football development for Indian Super League club Kerala Blasters.

Born on 14 June 1974, he did his schooling from Don Bosco School, Tura. He was the captain of the school's football and basketball teams and was involved in various school and district tournaments. He went on to represent the state of Meghalaya at the National School Games (Football) competition held at Kolkata in 1989.

He completed his master's degree in Physical Education from HVPM College of Physical Education in Amravati, Maharashtra. Represented Amravati University 4 (four) times in the All India University Tournaments from 1993 to 1997. He also went onto represent the state of Meghalaya in the Santosh Trophy in 1997.

He joined Sports Authority of India (SAI) as a football coach in 2001 and was posted in SAI Guwahati, Assam till 2003. Thereafter, joined the Directorate of Sports and Youth Affairs, Meghalaya from 2003 to 2012.

== Coaching career ==
=== Shillong Lajong: 2013–2017 ===
Singto joined Shillong Lajong's coaching staff back in 2009 and has been here since. However, on 22 January 2013 it was officially confirmed that Singto would become the interim head coach of the club after the sacking of Desmond Bulpin from the squad.

On 7 June 2017, after the 2016–17 season, Singto's contract was not renewed by Shillong Lajong and the two parted ways.

=== NorthEast United ===
Shillong Lajong a partner of Northeast United in the first ever ISL season, Singto was assistant manager of the Guwahati-based ISL team in 2014.

=== Kerala Blasters ===
On 25 June 2017, a few weeks after leaving Shillong Lajong, Singto signed with Indian Super League side Kerala Blasters as assistant coach and technical director of their youth development program. Thangboi was named as temporary Head Coach of Kerala Blasters following the departure of Rene Muelensteen in January 2018 until the arrival of David James.

=== Delhi Dynamos (Odisha FC) ===
In August 2019, Singto moved to Delhi Dynamos as assistant coach under their Spanish head coach Josep Gombau. He also moved to Bhubaneswar with the club as it rebranded to Odisha FC and stayed there for a full season. During June 2020, the club announced that Thangboi Singto is no longer a part of the managerial team.

He has worked with numerous India national football team players like Sandesh Jhingan, CK Vineeth, Sahal Abdul Samad, Rocus Lamare, Jeje Lalpekhlua, Pritam Kotal, Eugeneson Lyngdoh, Aiborlang Khongjee, Subrata Paul, Sandeep Nandy, Renedy Singh.

Some of the players who were groomed by Singto and who played and continue to play in the Indian Super League clubs are Chinglensana Singh, Vishal Kaith, Nim Dorjee Tamang, Isaac Vanlalsawma, Bipin Singh, Redeem Tlang, Pritam Singh, Samuel Lalmuanpuia, Phurba Lachenpa, Rupert Nongrum.

Singto has also worked alongside some well known coaches in Indian Super League like Ricky Herbert, René Meulensteen, Nelo Vingada, Josep Gombau, David James, Manolo Márquez.

Also shared training and dressing room with some world class players like Dimitar Berbatov, Wes Brown, Ian Hume, and Bartholomew Ogbeche.

== Managerial statistics ==
As of match played 11 December 2024

Managerial record by team and tenure
Team	Nat	From	To	Record					Ref
Team	Nat	From	To	G	W	D	L	Win %	Ref
Shillong Lajong	(India)	22 January 2013	7 June 2017	93	30	30	33	32.26	
Hyderabad	(India)	7 July 2023	18 December 2024	39	4	7	28	10.26	
Total				132	34	37	61	25.76	—

== Honours ==
Shillong Lajong

- Shillong Premier League: 2014, 2015, 2016
- Meghalaya Invitation Cup: 2016
- Bodousa Cup: 2016
