= List of Indian Super League seasons =

Indian Super League
- Founded: 21 October 2013
- Country: India
- Confederation: AFC
- Number of clubs: 14
- Level on pyramid: 1
- International cup(s): Champions League 2 Challenge League
- Current champions: East Bengal (1st title) (2025–26)
- Current premiers: East Bengal (1st title) (2025–26)
- Most championships: ATK (3 titles)
- Most premierships: Mohun Bagan SG, Mumbai City (2 titles)
- Current: 2025–26 Indian Super League

The Indian Super League (ISL) is a men's professional football league, which is the top tier league in Indian football system. It started in 2014.

The league currently comprises 14 clubs. Each season of the tournament generally runs from September/October/November to May. During the league stage of the competition, each club plays against all the other clubs in a round-robin style. At the end of the league stage, the team with the most points gets declared the Premiers and presented with a trophy named League Winners Shield, and the top four clubs qualify for the play-offs. The season then culminates with the ISL Final to determine the Champions who are presented with the ISL Trophy.

== List of seasons ==
Season	Teams	Matches	Premiers	Champions	Top scorer(s)		Asia			Avg. attendance
Season	Teams	Matches	Premiers	Champions	Player	Goals	Champions League/ Champions League Elite	AFC Cup/ Champions League 2	Challenge League	Avg. attendance
2014	8	61	Title did not exist	Atlético de Kolkata	(Brazil) Elano	8	—	—	—	24,357
2015	8	61	Title did not exist	Chennaiyin	(Colombia) Stiven Mendoza	13	—	—	—	27,111
2016	8	61	Title did not exist	Atlético de Kolkata	(Brazil) Marcelinho Leite Pereira	10	—	—	—	21,003
2017–18	10	95	Title did not exist	Chennaiyin	(Spain) Coro	18	—	Chennaiyin	—	15,047
2018–19	10	95	Title did not exist	Bengaluru	(Spain) Coro	16	—	Bengaluru	—	13,155
2019–20	10	95	Goa	ATK	(Nigeria) Bartholomew Ogbeche (Lithuania) Nerijus Valskis (Fiji) Roy Krishna	15	Goa	ATK Mohun Bagan (Note: Mohun Bagan qualified for the 2021 AFC Cup group stage by winning the 2019–20 I-League, therefore after the merger, ATK Mohun Bagan earned the spot.); Bengaluru (Note: ATK qualified for the 2021 AFC Cup qualifying play-offs by winning the 2020 Indian Super League final, but after ATK and Mohun Bagan merged, Bengaluru received the spot as the third place team of 2019–20 Indian Super League.)	—	13,052
2020–21	11	115	Mumbai City	Mumbai City	(Spain) Igor Angulo (Fiji) Roy Krishna	14	Mumbai City	ATK Mohun Bagan	—	0 (Note: The league was hosted behind closed doors due to the COVID-19 pandemic in India)
2021–22	11	115	Jamshedpur	Hyderabad	(Nigeria) Bartholomew Ogbeche	18	Jamshedpur (Note: Qualification to Playoffs for 2023–24 AFC Champions League group stage)	Hyderabad (Note: Qualification to Playoffs for 2023–24 AFC Cup qualifying playoffs)	—	0 (Note: Excluding the final, the league was hosted behind closed doors due to the COVID-19 pandemic in India)
2022–23	11	117	Mumbai City	ATK Mohun Bagan	(Australia) Dimitri Petratos (Brazil) Diego Maurício (Brazil) Cleiton Silva	12	Mumbai City (Note: Qualification to Playoffs for 2023–24 AFC Champions League group stage)	ATK Mohun Bagan (Note: Qualification to Playoffs for 2023–24 AFC Cup qualifying playoffs)	—	12,749
2023–24	12	139	Mohun Bagan	Mumbai City	(Greece) Dimitrios Diamantakos (Fiji) Roy Krishna	13	Mohun Bagan	East Bengal	East Bengal	12,311
2024–25	13	163	Mohun Bagan	Mohun Bagan	(Morocco) Alaeddine Ajaraie	23	—	Mohun Bagan	Goa	11,870
2025–26	14	91	East Bengal	East Bengal	(Spain) Youssef Ezzejjari	11	—	—	East Bengal; Goa	8,634

== ISL Cup finals ==
Season	Date	Champions	Score	Runners–up	Player of the match	Venue	Attendance
2014	20 December 2014	Atlético de Kolkata	1–0	Kerala Blasters	(India) Mohammed Rafique (Atlético de Kolkata)	DY Patil Stadium	36,484
2015	20 December 2015	Chennaiyin	3–2	Goa	(Spain) Jofre Mateu (Goa)	Fatorda Stadium	18,477
2016	18 December 2016	Atlético de Kolkata	1–1 (4–3 p)	Kerala Blasters	(Spain) Henrique Sereno (Atlético de Kolkata)	Jawaharlal Nehru Stadium (Kochi)	82,146
2017–18	17 March 2018	Chennaiyin	3–2	Bengaluru	(Brazil) Maílson Alves (Chennaiyin)	Sree Kanteerava Stadium	25,753
2018–19	17 March 2019	Bengaluru	1–0	Goa	(India) Rahul Bheke (Bengaluru)	Mumbai Football Arena	7,372
2019–20	14 March 2020	ATK	3–1	Chennaiyin	(India) Arindam Bhattacharya	Fatorda Stadium	0 (Note: The final was hosted behind closed doors due to the COVID-19 pandemic in India)
2020–21	13 March 2021	Mumbai City	2–1	ATK Mohun Bagan	(India) Bipin Singh (Mumbai City)	Fatorda Stadium	0
2021–22	20 March 2022	Hyderabad	1–1 (3–1 p)	Kerala Blasters	(India) Laxmikant Kattimani (Hyderabad)	Fatorda Stadium	11,500
2022–23	18 March 2023	ATK Mohun Bagan	2–2 (4–3 p)	Bengaluru	(Australia) Dimitri Petratos (ATK Mohun Bagan)	Fatorda Stadium	11,879
2023–24	4 May 2024	Mumbai City	3–1	Mohun Bagan	(India) Lalengmawia Ralte (Mumbai City)	Vivekananda Yuba Bharati Krirangan	62,007
2024–25	12 April 2025	Mohun Bagan	2–1 (aet)	Bengaluru	(Australia) Jamie Maclaren (Mohun Bagan)	Vivekananda Yuba Bharati Krirangan	59,112
