= List of Indian Super League hat-tricks =

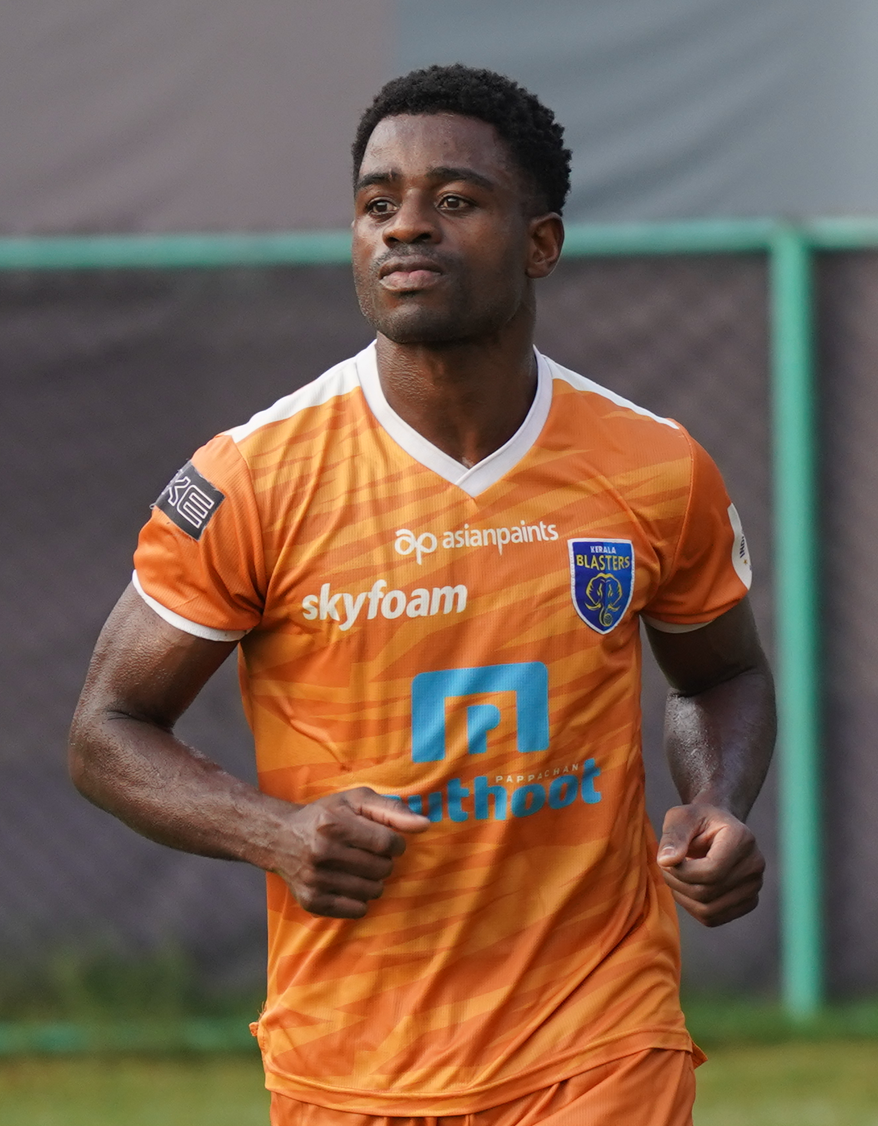
Bartholomew Ogbeche has scored the most hat-tricks (4) in the Indian Super League.

Since the inception of the Indian football league competition, the Indian Super League, in 2014, 28 players have scored three goals (a hat-trick) or more in a single match. The first player to achieve the feat was Brazilian André Moritz, who scored three times for Mumbai City in a 5–0 victory over Pune City.

Bartholomew Ogbeche has scored three or more goals four times in the Indian Super League, more than any other player. The fixture between Goa and Mumbai City in 2015 saw both Dudu Omagbemi and Thongkhosiem Haokip score a hat-trick for the home team in 7–0 victory. Colombian Stiven Mendoza became the first player to score multiple hat-tricks. Coro is the only player to score a hat-trick in two consecutive matches; his hat-trick in 7 minutes against Kerala Blasters in December 2017 is the fastest in Indian Super League history.

== Hat-tricks ==
As of 7 December 2024

Key
| ^{4} | Player scored four goals |
| ^{D L} | Player was not on the winning team (game drawn or lost) |
| * | The home team |

Note: The results column shows the scorer's team score first

| Player | Nationality | For | Against | Result | Date | Ref |
|---|---|---|---|---|---|---|
| André Moritz | Brazil | Mumbai City* | Pune City | 5–0 | 18 October 2014 | |
| Stiven Mendoza (1) | Colombia | Chennaiyin | Goa* | 4–0 | 11 October 2015 | |
| Sunil Chhetri (1) | India | Mumbai City* | NorthEast United | 5–1 | 28 October 2015 | |
| Iain Hume (1) | Canada | Atlético de Kolkata | Mumbai City* | 4–1 | 1 November 2015 | |
| Dudu Omagbemi (1) | Nigeria | Goa* | Mumbai City | 7–0 | 17 November 2015 | |
| Thongkhosiem Haokip | India | Goa* | Mumbai City | 7–0 | 17 November 2015 | |
| Stiven Mendoza (2) | Colombia | Chennaiyin* | Kerala Blasters | 4–1 | 21 November 2015 | |
| Iain Hume (2) | Canada | Atlético de Kolkata* | Pune City | 4–1 | 27 November 2015 | |
| Reinaldo | Brazil | Goa | Kerala Blasters* | 5–1 | 29 November 2015 | |
| Diego Forlán | Uruguay | Mumbai City* | Kerala Blasters | 5–0 | 19 November 2016 | |
| Dudu Omagbemi^{D} (2) | Nigeria | Chennaiyin* | NorthEast United | 3–3 | 26 November 2016 | |
| Marcelinho (1) | Brazil | Delhi Dynamos* | Goa | 5–1 | 27 November 2016 | |
| Coro (1) | Spain | Goa* | Bengaluru | 4–3 | 30 November 2017 | |
| Coro (2) | Spain | Goa* | Kerala Blasters | 5–2 | 9 December 2017 | |
| Marcelinho (2) | Brazil | Pune City* | NorthEast United | 5–0 | 30 December 2017 | |
| Iain Hume (3) | Canada | Kerala Blasters | Delhi Dynamos* | 3–1 | 10 January 2018 | |
| Seiminlen Doungel | India | NorthEast United* | Chennaiyin | 3–1 | 19 January 2018 | |
| Sunil Chhetri (2) | India | Bengaluru* | Pune City | 3–1 | 11 March 2018 | |
| Bartholomew Ogbeche (1) | Nigeria | NorthEast United | Chennaiyin* | 4–3 | 18 October 2018 | |
| Modou Sougou^{4} (1) | Senegal | Mumbai City* | Kerala Blasters | 6–1 | 16 December 2018 | |
| Modou Sougou (2) | Senegal | Mumbai City | ATK* | 3–1 | 22 February 2019 | |
| Bartholomew Ogbeche^{L} (2) | Nigeria | Kerala Blasters* | Chennaiyin | 3–6 | 1 February 2020 | |
| Roy Krishna | Fiji | ATK* | Odisha | 3–1 | 8 February 2020 | |
| Manuel Onwu^{D} | Spain | Odisha* | Kerala Blasters | 4–4 | 23 February 2020 | |
| Bipin Singh | India | Mumbai City | Odisha* | 6–1 | 24 February 2021 | |
| Greg Stewart | Scotland | Jamshedpur | Odisha* | 4–0 | 14 December 2021 | |
| Deshorn Brown^{D} | Jamaica | NorthEast United* | Mumbai City | 3–3 | 27 December 2021 | |
| Bartholomew Ogbeche (3) | Nigeria | Hyderabad | East Bengal* | 4–0 | 24 January 2022 | |
| Kiyan Nassiri | India | ATK Mohun Bagan* | East Bengal | 3–1 | 29 January 2022 | |
| Jorge Ortiz | Spain | Goa | Chennaiyin* | 5–0 | 9 February 2022 | |
| Airam Cabrera^{D} | Spain | Goa* | Kerala Blasters | 4–4 | 6 March 2022 | |
| Dimitri Petratos | Australia | ATK Mohun Bagan | Kerala Blasters* | 5–2 | 16 October 2022 | |
| Abdenasser El Khayati | Netherlands | Chennaiyin | NorthEast United* | 7–3 | 10 December 2022 | |
| Bartholomew Ogbeche (4) | Nigeria | Hyderabad | Goa* | 3–1 | 5 January 2023 | |
| Iker Guarrotxena | Spain | Goa* | East Bengal | 4–2 | 26 January 2023 | |
| Daniel Chima Chukwu | Nigeria | Jamshedpur | Hyderabad* | 5–0 | 21 December 2023 | |
| Vikram Pratap Singh | India | Mumbai City* | NorthEast United | 4–1 | 12 March 2024 | |
| Noah Sadaoui | Morocco | Goa* | Hyderabad | 4–0 | 5 April 2024 | |
| Borja Herrera | Spain | Goa | East Bengal* | 3-2 | 27 September 2024 | |
| Sunil Chhetri (3) | India | Bengaluru* | Kerala Blasters | 4–2 | 7 December 2024 | |

== Multiple hat-tricks ==
The following table lists the number of hat-tricks scored by players who have scored two or more.

As of 7 December 2024

Players in bold are still active in the Indian Super League.

Multiple Indian Super League hat-tricks by player
| Rank | Player | Hat-tricks | Last hat-trick |
|---|---|---|---|
| 1 | (Nigeria) Bartholomew Ogbeche | 4 | 5 January 2023 |
| 2 | (Canada) Iain Hume | 3 | 10 January 2018 |
| 2 | **(India) Sunil Chhetri** | 3 | 7 December 2024 |
| 3 | (Colombia) Stiven Mendoza | 2 | 21 November 2015 |
| 3 | (Nigeria) Dudu Omagbemi | 2 | 26 November 2016 |
| 3 | (Spain) Coro | 2 | 9 December 2017 |
| 3 | (Brazil) Marcelinho | 2 | 30 December 2017 |
| 3 | (Senegal) Modou Sougou | 2 | 22 February 2019 |

== Hat-tricks by nationality ==
The following table lists the number of hat-tricks scored by players from a single nation.

As of 7 December 2024

Indian Super League hat-tricks by nationality
| Rank | Nation | Hat-tricks | Last hat-trick |
|---|---|---|---|
| 1 | India | 8 | 7 December 2024 |
| 2 | Nigeria | 7 | 21 December 2023 |
| 2 | Spain | 7 | 27 September 2024 |
| 4 | Brazil | 4 | 30 December 2017 |
| 5 | Canada | 3 | 10 January 2018 |
| 6 | Colombia | 2 | 21 November 2015 |
| 6 | Senegal | 2 | 22 February 2019 |
| 8 | Fiji | 1 | 8 February 2020 |
| 8 | Jamaica | 1 | 27 December 2021 |
| 8 | Scotland | 1 | 14 December 2021 |
| 8 | Uruguay | 1 | 19 November 2016 |
| 8 | Australia | 1 | 16 October 2022 |
| 8 | Netherlands | 1 | 10 December 2022 |
| 8 | Morocco | 1 | 5 April 2024 |

== See also ==
- List of I-League hat-tricks
- List of Indian Women's League hat-tricks
- List of India national football team hat-tricks
