= 2022–23 Chennaiyin FC season =

2022–23 season of Chennaiyin FC

Chennaiyin
2022–2023 season
- Owner: Abhishek Bachchan; MS Dhoni; Vita Dani
- Head Coach: Thomas Brdarić
- Stadium: Jawaharlal Nehru Stadium
- Indian Super League: 8th out of 11
- AIFF Super Cup: Group Stage
- Durand Cup: Quarter-finals
Home colours	Away colours	Third colours

The 2022–23 Chennaiyin season is the club's ninth season since its establishment in 2014 as well as their Ninth season in 2022–23 Indian Super League season. In addition to the league, they will also compete in the 2022 Durand Cup and AIFF Super Cup.

== Management team ==
Position	Name
Head coach	(Germany) Thomas Brdarić
Assistant coach	(Croatia) Matko Djarmati
Assistant coach	(India) Syed Sabir Pasha (India) Raman Vijayan(for Super Cup games)
Goalkeeping coach	(India) Rajat Guha
Assistant sports scientist	(India) Atharva Tere

== Durand Cup squad ==
As of 16 August 2022

- * denotes a player who is unavailable for rest of the season.

No.	Name	Nationality	Position(s)	Date of Birth (Age)	Contract until	Signed From
Goalkeepers
1	Samik Mitra	(India)	GK	1 December 2000 (age 25)	2023	(India) Indian Arrows
24	Debjit Majumder	(India)	GK	6 March 1988 (age 38)	2023	(India) SC East Bengal
35	Devansh Dabas	(India)	GK	10 September 2001 (age 25)	2023	(India) Lonestar Kashmir FC
Defenders
2	Reagan Singh	(India)	RB	1 April 1991 (age 35)	2023	(India) NorthEast United FC
3	Fallou Diagne	(Senegal)	CB	14 July 1989 (age 37)	2023	(Albania) Vllaznia Shkodër
4	Gurmukh Singh	(India)	CB	1 January 1999 (age 27)	2023	(India) Rajasthan United FC
5	Mohammad Sajid Dhot	(India)	CB	10 December 1997 (age 28)	2024	(India) Odisha FC
6	Vafa Hakhamaneshi	(Iran)	CB	27 March 1991 (age 35)	2023	(Thailand) Ratchaburi
13	Ajith Kumar	(India)	LB	13 November 1996 (age 29)	2023	(India) Bengaluru FC
21	Narayan Das	(India)	LB/CB	25 September 1993 (age 33)	2023	(India) SC East Bengal
27	Aakash Sangwan	(India)	LB	28 October 1995 (age 31)	2023	(India) RoundGlass Punjab
28	Monotosh Chakladar	(India)	LB	4 April 1998 (age 28)	2023	(India) Madan Maharaj
36	Aqib Nawab	(India)	RB/CB	7 April 2002 (age 24)	2023	(India) Chennaiyin FC B
93	Salam Ranjan Singh	(India)	CB	4 December 1995 (age 30)	2023	(India) ATK Mohun Bagan FC
Midfielders
8	Edwin Sydney Vanspaul	(India)	CM/CDM/RB	12 September 1992 (age 34)	2023	(India) Chennai City FC
10	Rafael Crivellaro	(Brazil)	CM/AM	18 February 1989 (age 37)	2023	(Portugal) C.D. Feirense
15	Anirudh Thapa (Captain)	(India)	CM/AM	15 January 1998 (age 28)	2024	(India) AIFF Elite Academy
19	Sajal Bag	(India)	AM	19 May 2003 (age 23)	2024	(India) BSS Sporting
22	Chris Anthoy White	(India)	CM	4 July 2003 (age 23)	2023	(India) Chennaiyin FC B
25	Jockson Dhas	(India)	CM	9 April 1995 (age 31)	2024	(India) Madan Maharaj
26	Julius Düker	(Germany)	CDM/CM/AM	4 January 1996 (age 30)	2023	(Germany) TSV Havelse
37	Jiteshwor Singh	(India)	CM/CDM	10 December 2001 (age 24)	2023	(India) NEROCA
Forwards
7	Ninthoi Meetei	(India)	RW/RM	13 July 2001 (age 25)	2024	(India) NorthEast United FC
9	Petar Sliskovic	(Croatia)	ST	21 February 1991 (age 35)	2023	(Germany) Wehen Wiesbaden
11	Rahim Ali	(India)	ST/LW/RW	21 May 2000 (age 26)	2023	(India) Indian Arrows
12	Kwame Karikari	(Ghana)	ST	20 January 1991 (age 35)	2023	(Thailand) Nakhon Ratchasima
23	Jobby Justin	(India)	ST/RW	10 November 1993 (age 33)	2023	(India) ATK Mohun Bagan FC
34	Senthamil Suman	(India)	ST	21 July 2000 (age 26)	2023	(India) Muthoot FA
42	Suhail Pasha	(India)	FW/AM	26 September 1999 (age 27)	2023	(India) Chennai City FC
47	Vincy Barretto	(India)	RW	8 December 1999 (age 26)	2025	(India) Kerala Blasters

== Players ==
=== Squad information ===
As of 28 July 2022

- * denotes a player who is unavailable for rest of the season.

No.	Name	Nationality	Position(s)	Date of Birth (Age)	Contract until	Signed From
Goalkeepers
1	Samik Mitra	(India)	GK	1 December 2000 (age 25)	2023	(India) Indian Arrows
24	Debjit Majumder	(India)	GK	6 March 1988 (age 38)	2023	(India) SC East Bengal
35	Devansh Dabas	(India)	GK	10 September 2001 (age 25)	2023	(India) Lonestar Kashmir FC
32	Lovepreet Singh	(India)	GK	10 September 1998 (age 28)	2023	(India) Indian Arrows
Defenders
2	Reagan Singh	(India)	RB	1 April 1991 (age 35)	2023	(India) NorthEast United FC
3	Fallou Diagne	(Senegal)	CB	14 July 1989 (age 37)	2023	(Albania) Vllaznia Shkodër
4	Gurmukh Singh	(India)	CB	1 January 1999 (age 27)	2023	(India) Rajasthan United FC
5	Mohammad Sajid Dhot	(India)	CB	10 December 1997 (age 28)	2024	(India) Odisha FC
6	Vafa Hakhamaneshi	(Iran)	CB	27 March 1991 (age 35)	2023	(Thailand) Ratchaburi
13	Ajith Kumar	(India)	LB	13 November 1996 (age 29)	2023	(India) Bengaluru FC
21	Narayan Das	(India)	LB/CB	25 September 1993 (age 33)	2023	(India) SC East Bengal
27	Aakash Sangwan	(India)	LB	28 October 1995 (age 31)	2023	(India) RoundGlass Punjab
28	Monotosh Chakladar	(India)	LB	4 April 1998 (age 28)	2023	(India) Madan Maharaj
36	Aqib Nawab	(India)	CB/RB	7 April 2002 (age 24)	2023	(India) Chennaiyin FC B
43	Balaji Ganesan	(India)	LB/LM	28 February 2002 (age 24)	2023	(India) Chennaiyin FC B
47	Rahul Manjula	(India)	LB/LM	16 January 2004 (age 22)	2023	(India) Chennaiyin FC U-16
93	Salam Ranjan Singh	(India)	CB	4 December 1995 (age 30)	2023	(India) ATK Mohun Bagan FC
	Lijo Francis	(India)	LB	15 August 1999 (age 27)	2024	(India) Madan Maharaj
Midfielders
8	Edwin Sydney Vanspaul	(India)	CM/CDM/RB	12 September 1992 (age 34)	2023	(India) Chennai City FC
10	Rafael Crivellaro	(Brazil)	CM/AM	18 February 1989 (age 37)	2023	(Portugal) C.D. Feirense
18	Sourav Das	(India)	CM/CDM	20 June 1996 (age 30)	2023	(India) East Bengal
19	Sajal Bag	(India)	AM	19 May 2003 (age 23)	2024	(India) BSS Sporting
20	Mohammed Rafique	(India)	CM/RB	26 March 1991 (age 35)	2024	(India) East Bengal
22	Chris Anthoy White	(India)	CM	4 July 2003 (age 23)	2023	(India) Chennaiyin FC B
25	Jockson Dhas	(India)	CM	9 April 1995 (age 31)	2024	(India) Madan Maharaj
26	Julius Düker	(Germany)	CDM/CM/AM	4 January 1996 (age 30)	2023	(Germany) TSV Havelse
37	Jiteshwor Singh	(India)	CM/CDM	10 December 2001 (age 24)	2023	(India) NEROCA
38	Subhadip Majhi	(India)	CM/CDM/CB	20 May 1999 (age 27)	2024	(India) Kalighat FC
Forwards
7	Ninthoi Meetei	(India)	RW/RM	13 July 2001 (age 25)	2024	(India) NorthEast United FC
9	Petar Sliskovic	(Croatia)	ST	21 February 1991 (age 35)	2023	(Germany) Wehen Wiesbaden
11	Rahim Ali	(India)	ST/LW/RW	21 May 2000 (age 26)	2023	(India) Indian Arrows
14	Alexander Romario Jesuraj	(India)	RW	26 July 1996 (age 30)	2025	(India) Goa
12	Kwame Karikari	(Ghana)	ST	20 January 1991 (age 35)	2023	(Thailand) Nakhon Ratchasima
23	Jobby Justin	(India)	ST/RW	10 November 1993 (age 33)	2023	(India) ATK Mohun Bagan FC
34	Senthamil Suman	(India)	ST	21 July 2000 (age 26)	2023	(India) Muthoot FA
42	Suhail Pasha	(India)	FW/AM	26 September 1999 (age 27)	2023	(India) Chennai City FC
45	Mohamed Liyaakath	(India)	ST	18 May 2004 (age 22)	2023	(India) Indian Arrows
47	Vincy Barretto	(India)	RW	8 December 1999 (age 26)	2025	(India) Kerala Blasters
50	Johnson Mathews	(India)	FW/AM/RW	30 June 2001 (age 25)	2023	Bank of India
	Joseph Lalvenhima	(India)	LW	27 May 2002 (age 24)	2023	(India) Chennaiyin FC B
	Gulab Rauth	(India)	LW	26 April 2003 (age 23)	2023	(India) RF Young Champs

== Transfers ==
=== In ===
Date	No.	Pos.	Player	From	Fee	Source
1 June 2022	47	RW	(India) Vincy Barretto	(India) Kerala Blasters	Undisclosed fee	
2 June 2022	14	RW	(India) Alexander Romario Jesuraj	(India) Goa	Free Transfer	
5 June 2022	28	LB	(India) Monotosh Chakladar	(India) Madan Maharaj	Free Transfer	
8 June 2022	37	DM	(India) Jiteshwor Singh	(India) NEROCA	Free Transfer	
9 June 2022	18	DM	(India) Sourav Das	(India) East Bengal	Free Transfer	
11 June 2022	4	CB	(India) Gurmukh Singh	(India) Rajasthan United FC	Free Transfer	
16 June 2022	20	CM	(India) Mohammed Rafique	(India) East Bengal	Free Transfer	
21 June 2022	27	LB	(India) Aakash Sangwan	(India) RoundGlass Punjab	Free Transfer	
21 June 2022	19	CM	(India) Sajal Bag	(India) BSS Sporting	Free Transfer	
27 June 2022	3	CB	(Senegal) Fallou Diagne	(Albania) Vllaznia Shkodër	Free Transfer	
29 June 2022	6	CB	(Iran) Vafa Hakhamaneshi	Free Agent	Free Transfer	
30 June 2022	12	ST	(Ghana) Kwame Karikari	(Thailand) Swat Cat	Free Transfer	
4 July 2022		LB	(India) Lijo Francis	(India) Madan Maharaj	Free Transfer	
4 July 2022	25	CM	(India) Jockson Dhas	(India) Madan Maharaj	Free Transfer	
4 July 2022	34	ST	(India) Senthamizhi Suman	(India) Muthoot FA	Free Transfer	
4 July 2022	22	CM	(India) Chris Antony White	(India) Chennaiyin FC B	Free Transfer	
4 July 2022		LW	(India) Joseph Lalvenhima	(India) Chennaiyin FC B	Free Transfer	
6 July 2022	9	ST	(Croatia) Petar Sliskovic	(Germany) Wehen Wiesbaden	Free Transfer	
15 July 2022		LW	(India) Gulab Rauth	(India) RF Young Champs	Free Transfer	
20 July 2022	26	DM	(Germany) Julius Düker	(Germany) TSV Havelse	Free Transfer	
28 July 2022	13	LB	(India) Ajith Kumar	(India) Bengaluru FC	Undisclosed Fee	
30 July 2022		GK	(India) Lovepreet Singh	(India) Indian Arrows	Free Transfer	

=== Out ===
Date	No.	Pos.	Player	To	Fee	Source
27 May 2022	17	FW/LW/AM	(Kyrgyzstan) Mirlan Murzaev	(Kyrgyzstan) Alga Bishkek	Free Transfer	
4 June 2022	26	CB	(India) Deepak Devrani		Released	
4 June 2022	32	RB	(India) Davinder Singh		Released	
23 June 2022	99	ST	(Poland) Lukasz Gikiewicz		Released	
23 June 2022	7	LW/AM	(India) Lallianzuala Chhangte	(India) Mumbai City	Free Transfer	
8 July 2022	13	GK	(India) Vishal Kaith	(India) ATK Mohun Bagan FC	Free Transfer	
10 July 2022		CB	(India) Melroy Assisi	(India) Rajasthan United FC	Free Transfer	
13 July 2022	77	AM	(Hungary) Vladimir Koman	(Hungary) Diósgyőri VTK	Free Transfer	
25 July 2022	16	CM	(Poland) Ariel Borysiuk	(Albania) KF Laçi	Free Transfer	
3 August 2022	18	LB/LM	(India) Jerry Lalrinzuala	(India) East Bengal	Free Transfer	
4 August 2022	9	ST	(Lithuania) Nerijus Valskis	(Lithuania) FK Kauno Žalgiris	Free Transfer	
8 August 2022	28	CM/CDM	(India) Germanpreet Singh	(India) Jamshedpur FC	Free Transfer	
18 August 2022	23	CB	(Serbia) Slavko Damjanović	(Serbia) FK Novi Pazar	Free Transfer	

== Pre-season and friendlies ==
Win Draw Loss Fixtures

30 July 2022 Friendly	Chennaiyin FC	5-1	Kidderpore SC	Kolkata, India
16.00 IST	Anirudh Thapa; Ninthoinganba Meetei; Jockson Dhas; Vincy Barretto; Syed Suhail Pasha		Goal	Attendance: 0

6 August 2022 Friendly	Chennaiyin FC	1-1	Green Army FT	Kolkata, India
16.00 IST	Anirudh Thapa		Goal	Attendance: 0

10 August 2022 Friendly	Chennaiyin FC	1-2	Mohammedan SC	Kolkata, India
16.00 IST	Petar Slišković		Ousmane N'Diaye; Ningthoujam Pritam Singh

14 August 2022 Friendly	Chennaiyin FC	v	ATK Mohun Bagan FC	Kolkata, India
IST				Stadium: Mohun Bagan Ground

1 October 2022 Friendly	Chennaiyin FC	5-1	Odisha FC	Chennai, India
IST	Anirudh Thapa Rahim Ali Petar Slišković Kwame Karikari Syed Suhail Pasha		Diego Maurício	Stadium: Sri Ramachandra Sports Science

== Competitions ==
=== Overall record ===
Competition	First match	Last match	Starting round	Final position	Record							
Competition	First match	Last match	Starting round	Final position	Pld	W	D	L	GF	GA	GD	Win %
Indian Super League	TBC	TBC	Matchday 1	TBC	0	0	0	0	0	0	+0	—
Durand Cup	Quarter Final	TBC	Group Stage	TBC	0	0	0	0	0	0	+0	—
AIFF Super Cup	TBC	TBC	Group Stage	TBC	0	0	0	0	0	0	+0	—
Total					0	0	0	0	0	0	+0	—

Last updated: pre-season
Source: Competitions

=== Durand Cup ===
Pos	Team	Pld	W	D	L	GF	GA	GD	Pts	Qualification	HYD	CHE	ARR	NER	TRA
1	Hyderabad	4	3	0	1	8	2	+6	9	Qualify for the Knockout stage	—	3–1	—	—	—
2	Chennaiyin	4	2	1	1	9	6	+3	7	Qualify for the Knockout stage	—	—	2–2	—	—
3	Army Red	4	1	2	1	4	4	0	5		1–0	—	—	0–0	—
4	NEROCA (H)	4	1	1	2	3	6	−3	4		0–3	0–2	—	—	3–1
5	TRAU (H)	4	1	0	3	4	10	−6	3		0–2	1–4	2–1	—	—

Source: Sportstar
Rules for classification: 1) points; 2) head-to-head points; 3) head-to-head goal difference; 4) goal difference; 5) number of goals scored; 6) drawing of lots
(H) Hosts

20 August 2022 1	Chennaiyin	2-2	Army Red	Imphal
15.00 IST				Stadium: Khuman Lampak Stadium

26 August 2022 2	Hyderabad	3–1	Chennaiyin	Imphal
15:00 IST	Yasir (yellow card) 39'; Victor 56' (pen.); Ogbeche 64', 74'	Report	Bag (yellow card) 35'; Thapa 42'; Diagne (red card) 54'	Stadium: Khuman Lampak Main Stadium

1 September 2022 3	TRAU	1-4	Chennaiyin	Imphal
18.00 IST				Stadium: Khuman Lampak Stadium

5 September 2022 4	NEROCA	0-2	Chennaiyin	Imphal
18.00 IST				Stadium: Khuman Lampak Stadium

=== Indian Super League ===
==== League table ====
Pos	Team	Pld	W	D	L	GF	GA	GD	Pts	Qualification
6	Odisha	20	9	3	8	30	32	−2	30	ISL Cup Knockouts, Playoffs for 2023–24 AFC Cup group stage (Note: Qualified via winning the 2023 Super Cup) and 2023–24 AFC Cup group stage (Note: Qualified via winning the Indian club qualifiers for 2023–24 AFC competitions)
7	Goa	20	8	3	9	36	35	+1	27 (Note: Head-to-head points: Goa 3, Chennaiyin 3. Head-to-head goal difference: Goa +1, Chennaiyin -1.)	
8	Chennaiyin	20	7	6	7	36	37	−1	27	
9	East Bengal	20	6	1	13	22	38	−16	19 (Note: Head-to-head points: East Bengal 3, Jamshedpur 3. Head-to-head goal difference: East Bengal +1, Jamshedpur -1.)	
10	Jamshedpur	20	5	4	11	21	32	−11	19	

Source: Indian Super League
Rules for classification: 1) points; 2) head-to-head points; 3) head-to-head goal difference; 4) head-to-head goals scored; 5) goal difference; 6) number of goals scored; 7) fair play ranking; 8) drawing of lots

==== Matches ====
Win Draw Loss Void / Postponed

10 October 2022 1	ATK Mohun Bagan	1–2	Chennaiyin	Kolkata
19:30 IST	Manvir 27'	Report	Kamraj (yellow card) 38'; Karikari 64' (pen.); Narayan (yellow card) 79'; Rahim 83'	Stadium: Vivekananda Yuba Bharati Krirangan; Attendance: 22,236; Referee: Crystal John; Man of the Match: Kwame Karikari (Chennaiyin)

14 October 2022 2	Chennaiyin	1–1	Bengaluru	Chennai
19:30 IST	Prasanth 45+1'	Report	Krishna 5'	Stadium: Jawaharlal Nehru Stadium; Referee: Crystal J. Man of the Match: Jiteshwor Singh (Chennaiyin)

14 October 2022 3	Chennaiyin	0–2	Goa	Chennai
19:30 IST				Stadium: Jawaharlal Nehru Stadium

4 November 2022 4	East Bengal	0–1	Chennaiyin	Kolkata
19:30 IST	Golui (yellow card) 5' (yellow-red card) 75'; Kamaljit (yellow card) 59'	Report; AIFF Report	Vafa (yellow card) 60' (yellow-red card) 70' (goal) 69'; Düker (yellow card) 90'	Stadium: Salt Lake Stadium; Attendance: 17,170; Referee: Umesh Bora; Man of the Match: Anirudh Thapa (Chennaiyin)

12 November 2022 5	Chennaiyin	2–6	Mumbai City	Chennai
19:30 IST				Stadium: Jawaharlal Nehru Stadium

19 November 2022 6	Chennaiyin	3–1	Jamshedpur	Chennai
17:30 IST	Slišković 27'; Kumar (yellow card) 35'; Hakhamaneshi (yellow card) 45+1'; Düker (yellow card) 59'; Diagne (yellow card) 61'; Barretto 77'; El Khayati 85'	Report	Pandita 76'	Stadium: Jawaharlal Nehru Stadium; Attendance: 9,788; Referee: L Priyobarta Singh; Man of the Match: Abdenasser El Khayati (Chennaiyin)

24 November 2022 7	Odisha	3–2	Chennaiyin	Bhubaneswar
19:30 IST				Stadium: Kalinga Stadium

3 December 2022 8	Chennaiyin	1–3	Hyderabad	Chennai
17:30 IST	Kumar (yellow card) 49' (yellow-red card) 72'; Slišković 79'	Report	Narzary 66'; Singh 75'; Herrera 86'; Mishra (yellow card) 90+2'	Stadium: Jawaharlal Nehru Stadium; Attendance: 8,207; Referee: Rahul Kumar Gupta; Man of the Match: Singh (Hyderabad)

10 December 2022 9	NorthEast United	3–7	Chennaiyin	Guwahati
19:30 IST	Wilmar Jordán 36' (pen.); Mashoor Shereef (yellow card) 67'; Romain Philippoteaux 73'; Rochharzela 90+5'	Report	Nasser El Khayati 11', 40', 48'; Petar Slišković 45', 57'; Julius Düker 68'; Joe Zoherliana 45' (o.g.)	Stadium: Indira Gandhi Athletic Stadium; Referee: Umesh Bora; Man of the Match: Nasser El Khayati (Chennaiyin)

19 December 2022 10	Chennaiyin	1–1	Kerala Blasters	Chennai
19:30 IST	Barretto 48'; Das (yellow card) 90+6'	Report	Sahal 23'; Rahul (yellow card) 69'; Kalyuzhnyi (yellow card) 72'	Stadium: Jawaharlal Nehru Stadium; Attendance: 11,132; Referee: Harish Kundu; Man of the Match: Adrián Luna (Kerala Blasters)

24 December 2022 11	Mumbai City	2–1	Chennaiyin	Mumbai
19:30 IST				Stadium: Mumbai Football Arena

7 January 2023 12	Jamshedpur	2–2	Chennaiyin	Jamshedpur
17:30 IST	Das 17', 56'; Halder (yellow card) 30'; Sabiá (yellow card) 33'	Report	Vanspaul (yellow card) 23'; Barretto 60'; Slišković 68'	Stadium: JRD Tata Sports Complex; Attendance: 9,224; Referee: L Priyobarta Singh; Man of the Match: Aakash Sangwan (Chennaiyin)

12 January 2023 13	Hyderabad	1–1	Chennaiyin	Hyderabad
19:30 IST	Ogbeche 87' (pen.); D'Silva (yellow card) 90+2'	Report	Slišković 57'; Mitra (yellow card) 87'	Stadium: G. M. C. Balayogi Athletic Stadium; Attendance: 6,427; Referee: Umesh Bora; Man of the Match: Düker (Chennaiyin)

21 January 2023 14	Chennaiyin	0–0	ATK Mohun Bagan	Chennai
19:30 IST		[ Report]		Stadium: Jawaharlal Nehru Stadium

28 January 2023 15	Bengaluru	3-1	Chennaiyin	Bengaluru
17:30 IST				Stadium: Sree Kanteerava Stadium

2 February 2023 16	Chennaiyin	2-2	Odisha	Chennai
19:30 IST				Stadium: Jawaharlal Nehru Stadium

7 February 2023 17	Kerala Blasters	2-1	Chennaiyin	Kochi
19:30 IST				Stadium: Jawaharlal Nehru Stadium

12 February 2023 18	Chennaiyin	2–0	East Bengal	Chennai
19:30 IST				Stadium: Jawaharlal Nehru Stadium
