= 2021–22 Chennaiyin FC season =

2021–22 season of Chennaiyin FC

Chennaiyin
2021–2022 season
- Owner: Abhishek Bachchan; MS Dhoni; Vita Dani
- Head Coach: Božidar Bandović
- Stadium: Tilak Maidan Stadium, Vasco da Gama
- Highest home attendance: 🔒 Closed Doors
- Lowest home attendance: 🔒 Closed Doors
- Average home league attendance: 🔒 Closed Doors
Home colours	Away colours	Third colours

The 2021–22 Chennaiyin FC season is the club's eighth season since its establishment in 2014 as well as their eighth season in 2021–22 Indian Super League season.

== Technical staff ==
As of 12 November 2021

Coaching Staff

Position	Name
Head Coach	(Montenegro) Bozidar Bandovic
Assistant Coach	(Serbia) Bojan Ofenbeher
Assistant Coach	(India) Syed Sabir Pasha
Goalkeeping Coach	(Serbia) Milorad Nikolic
Assistant Sports Scientist	(India) Atharva Tere

Medical staff

Position	Name
Team Doctor	(India) Dr. Ashay Jadhav
Head Physio	(India) Rajiv Kumar
Senior Masseur	(India) Nitin Patel
Junior Masseur	(India) Raju Salve

Management Staff

Position	Name
Team Manager	(India) Arihant Jain
Head of Football Operations	(India) Pratham Basu
Kit Manager	(India) Parthiban Manogar
Kit Manager	(India) Senthil Kumaran
Reserve and Academy coach	(India) Santosh Kashyap

Board of Directors

Position	Name
Owner	(India) MS Dhoni
Owner	(India) Abhishek Bachchan
Owner	(India) Vita Dani

== First-team squad ==
As of 31 December 2021

- * denotes a player who is unavailable for rest of the season.

No.	Name	Nationality	Position(s)	Date of Birth (Age)	Contract until	Signed From
Goalkeepers
13	Vishal Kaith	(India)	GK	22 July 1996 (age 30)	2022	(India) FC Pune City
24	Debjit Majumder	(India)	GK	6 March 1988 (age 38)	2023	(India) SC East Bengal
27	Samik Mitra	(India)	GK	1 December 2000 (age 25)	2022	(India) Indian Arrows
35	Devansh Dabas	(India)	GK	10 September 2001 (age 25)	2023	(India) Lonestar Kashmir FC
Defenders
2	Reagan Singh	(India)	RB	1 April 1991 (age 35)	2023	(India) NorthEast United FC
3	Mohammad Sajid Dhot	(India)	CB	10 December 1997 (age 28)	2022	(India) Odisha FC
5	Salam Ranjan Singh	(India)	CB	4 December 1995 (age 30)	2023	(India) ATK Mohun Bagan FC
8	Edwin Sydney Vanspaul	(India)	RB/CM/CDM	12 September 1992 (age 34)	2023	(India) Chennai City FC
18	Jerry Lalrinzuala	(India)	LB/LM	13 July 1998 (age 28)	2022	(India) AIFF Elite Academy
21	Narayan Das	(India)	LB/CB	25 September 1993 (age 32)	2023	(India) SC East Bengal
23	Slavko Damjanović	(Serbia)	CB	2 November 1992 (age 33)	2022	(Serbia) FK TSC Bačka Topola
26	Deepak Devrani	(India)	CB	10 December 1992 (age 33)	2022	(India) Gokulam Kerala FC
32	Davinder Singh	(India)	RB	23 September 1995 (age 30)	2022	Free Agent
36	Aqib Nawab	(India)	CB/RB	7 April 2002 (age 24)	2022	(India) Chennaiyin FC B
43	Balaji Ganesan	(India)	LB/LM	28 February 2002 (age 24)	2022	(India) Chennaiyin FC B
47	Rahul Manjula	(India)	LB/LM	16 January 2004 (age 22)	2022	(India) Chennaiyin FC U-16
Midfielders
12	Ninthoi Meetei	(India)	RW/RM/RB	13 July 2001 (age 25)	2024	(India) NorthEast United FC
7	Lallianzuala Chhangte	(India)	LW/LM	6 August 1997 (age 29)	2022	(India) Delhi Dynamos FC
10	Rafael Crivellaro	(Brazil)	CM/AM	18 February 1989 (age 37)	2023	(Portugal) C.D. Feirense
15	Anirudh Thapa (Captain)	(India)	CM/AM	15 January 1998 (age 28)	2023	(India) AIFF Elite Academy
16	Ariel Borysiuk	(Poland)	CM/CDM/CB	29 July 1991 (age 35)	2022	(Poland) Jagiellonia Bialystok
28	Germanpreet Singh	(India)	CM/CDM	24 June 1996 (age 30)	2022	(India) Minerva Punjab FC
38	Subhadip Majhi	(India)	CM/CDM/CB	20 May 1999 (age 27)	2024	(India) Kalighat FC
77	Vladimir Koman	(Hungary)	AM/CM	16 March 1989 (age 37)	2022	(United Arab Emirates) Hatta Club
Forwards
11	Rahim Ali	(India)	ST/LW/RW	21 May 2000 (age 26)	2023	(India) Indian Arrows
17	Mirlan Murzaev	(Kyrgyzstan)	FW/LW/AM	29 March 1990 (age 36)	2023	(Kyrgyzstan) FC Dordoi Bishkek
22	Jobby Justin	(India)	ST/RW	10 November 1993 (age 32)	2023	(India) ATK Mohun Bagan FC
42	Suhail Pasha	(India)	FW/AM	26 September 1999 (age 26)	2022	(India) Chennai City FC
45	Mohamed Liyaakath	(India)	ST	18 May 2004 (age 22)	2022	(India) Indian Arrows
50	Johnson Mathews	(India)	FW/AM/RW	30 June 2001 (age 25)	2022	Bank of India
99	Lukasz Gikiewicz	(Poland)	ST	26 October 1986 (age 39)	2022	(Bahrain) East Riffa
9	Nerijus Valskis	(Lithuania)	ST	4 August 1987 (age 39)	2022	(India) Jamshedpur

== Contract extensions ==
No.	Pos.	Player	Contract until	Ref.
8	MF	(India) Edwin Sydney Vanspaul	2023	
11	FW	(India) Rahim Ali	2023	
2	DF	(India) Reagan Singh	2023	
10	MF	(Brazil) Rafael Crivellaro	2023	

== Transfer ==
- * denotes a player who is signed in Winter Transfer.
- * denotes a player who is signed at End of season.

=== Transfer in ===
Entry date	Pos.	No.	Player	From club	Transfer Fee	Ref.
29 June 2021	DF	21	(India) Narayan Das	(India) SC East Bengal	Free Transfer	
2 July 2021	DF	5	(India) Salam Ranjan Singh	(India) ATK Mohun Bagan	Free Transfer	
7 July 2021	GK	24	(India) Debjit Majumder	(India) SC East Bengal	Free Transfer	
25 July 2021	FW	22	(India) Jobby Justin	(India) ATK Mohun Bagan	Free Transfer	
4 August 2021	DF	26	(India) Deepak Devrani	(India) Gokulam Kerala FC	Free Transfer	
5 August 2021	DF	23	(Serbia) Slavko Damjanović	(Serbia) Bačka Topola	Free Transfer	
10 August 2021	MF	16	(Poland) Ariel Borysiuk	(Poland) Jagiellonia	Free Transfer	
13 August 2021	DF	32	(India) Davinder Singh	Free Agent	-	
21 August 2021	FW	99	(Poland) Łukasz Gikiewicz	(Bahrain) East Riffa	Free Transfer	
23 August 2021	FW	17	(Kyrgyzstan) Mirlan Murzaev	(Kyrgyzstan) FC Dordoi Bishkek	Free Transfer	
31 August 2021	FW	12	(India) Ninthoi Meetei	(India) Northeast United FC	₹3.00M	
4 September 2021	MF	77	(Hungary) Vladimir Koman	(United Arab Emirates) Hatta Club	Free Transfer	
10 September 2021	MF	42	(India) Syed Suhail Pasha	(India) Chennai City F.C.	Free Transfer	
10 September 2021	GK	35	(India) Devansh Dabas	(India) Lonestar Kashmir FC	Free Transfer	
10 September 2021	MF	30	(India) Melroy Melwin Assisi	(India) Hyderia FC	Free Transfer	
10 September 2021	MF	38	(India) Subhadip Majhi	(India) Kalighat FC	Free Transfer	
1 November 2021	MF	50	(India) Johnson Joseph Mathews	Bank of India	Free Transfer	
1 November 2021	FW	47	(India) Mohamed Liyaakath	(India) Indian Arrows	Free Transfer	
1 November 2021	DF	45	(India) Rahul Manjula	(India) Chennaiyin FC U-16	-	
1 January 2022	FW	9	(Lithuania) Nerijus Valskis	(India) Jamshedpur	Free Transfer	
2 January 2022	DF	3	(India) Mohammad Sajid Dhot	(India) Odisha	Free Transfer	
31 May 2022	FW	7	(India) Lallianzuala Chhangte	(India) Mumbai City FC	End of Loan	

=== Transfer out ===
Exit date	Pos.	No.	Player	To club	Transfer Fee	Ref.
29 June 2021	MF	22	(India) Deepak Tangri	(India) ATK Mohun Bagan	Free Transfer	
1 July 2021	MF	14	(Spain) Manuel Lanzarote	Free Agent	-	
1 July 2021	GK	26	(India) B Y Revanth	Free Agent	-	
30 July 2021	DF	5	(Bosnia and Herzegovina) Enes Sipović	(India) Kerala Blasters FC	Free Transfer	
17 August 2021	MF	20	(Brazil) Memo	Free Agent	-	
18 August 2021	FW	99	(Guinea-Bissau) Isma	Free Agent	-	
20 August 2021	FW	11	(India) Thoi Singh	Free Agent	-	
23 August 2021	GK	1	(India) Karanjit Singh	Free Agent	-	>
31 August 2021	DF	13	(Brazil) Eli Sabiá	(India) Jamshedpur FC	Free Transfer	
9 September 2021	MF	21	(India) Abhijit Sarkar	Free Agent	-	
9 September 2021	MF	16	(India) Sinivasan Pandiyan	Gokulam Kerala	-	
15 September 2021	DF	3	(India) Lalchhuanmawia	(India) Roundglass Punjab FC	Free Transfer	
1 December 2021	FW	29	(India) Aman Chetri	(India) Rajasthan United FC	Free Transfer	
1 December 2021	DF	23	(India) Remi Aimol	Free Agent	-	
25 December 2021	MF	30	(India) Melroy Melwin Assisi	(India) Rajasthan United FC	Free Transfer	
31 January 2022	FW	7	(India) Lallianzuala Chhangte	(India) Mumbai City FC	Loan Transfer	

In Blue:Winter Transfer

== Pre-season and friendlies ==
Win Draw Loss Fixtures

21 October 2021 Friendly	(India) Chennaiyin FC	3–2	(India) Bengaluru FC	Utorda,Goa
16:00 IST	Ariel Borysiuk; Vladimir Koman; Edwin Sydney Vanspaul	Report	Leon Augustine; Cleiton Silva	Stadium: SAG Football Ground; Attendance: 🔒 Closed Doors

28 October 2021 Friendly	(India) Chennaiyin FC	1–2	(India) Odisha FC	Utorda,Goa
16:00 IST	Lukasz Gikiewicz (pen.)	Report	Javi; Victor Mongil	Stadium: SAG Football Ground; Attendance: 🔒 Closed Doors

5 November 2021 Friendly	(India) Chennaiyin FC	1–2	(India) Kerala Blasters FC	Utorda,Goa
16:00 IST	Salam Ranjan Singh 30'		Lalthathanga Khawlhring 34'; Adrián Luna 67'	Stadium: SAG Football Ground; Attendance: 🔒 Closed Doors
Note: 120-minute game

12 November 2021 Friendly	(India) FC Goa	0-3	(India) Chennaiyin FC	Salvador do Mundo, Goa
18:30 IST			Lallianzuala Chhangte 14'; Vladimir Koman 47'; Syed Suhail Pasha 110'	Stadium: Salvador do Mundo Panchayat Ground; Attendance: 🔒 Closed Doors
Note: 120-minute game

16 November 2021 Friendly	(India) Chennaiyin FC	2-3	(India) Bengaluru FC	Utorda,Goa
16:00 IST	Mirlan Murzaev 39'; Rahim Ali 59'		Iman Basafa (pen.); Sivasakthi Narayanan 82'; Naorem Roshan Singh	Stadium: SAG Football Ground; Attendance: 🔒 Closed Doors; Referee: Naushad Moosa

== Competition ==
=== Indian Super League ===
==== League table ====
Pos	Team	Pld	W	D	L	GF	GA	GD	Pts
6	Bengaluru	20	8	5	7	32	27	+5	29
7	Odisha	20	6	5	9	31	43	−12	23
8	Chennaiyin	20	5	5	10	17	35	−18	20
9	Goa	20	4	7	9	29	35	−6	19
10	NorthEast United	20	3	5	12	25	43	−18	14

Source: Indian Super League
Rules for classification: 1) points; 2) head-to-head points; 3) head-to-head goal difference; 4) head-to-head goals scored; 5) goal difference; 6) number of goals scored; 7) fair play ranking; 8) drawing of lots

==== Result summary ====
Overall								Home						Away					
Pld	W	D	L	GF	GA	GD	Pts	W	D	L	GF	GA	GD	W	D	L	GF	GA	GD
9	4	2	3	9	11	−2	14	1	1	2	4	8	−4	3	1	1	5	3	+2

==== Results by round ====
Matchday	1	2	3	4	5	6	7	8	9	10	11	12	13	14	15	16	17	18	19	20
Ground	A	A	H	A	A	H	H	H	A	A	H									
Result	W	W	D	D	L	W	L	L	W	L	D									
Position	4	2	1	3	5	3	6	6	5											

A = Away; H = Home; W = Win; D = Draw; L = Loss

==== Matches ====
Win Draw Loss Void / Postponed

23 November 2021 1	Hyderabad	0-1	Chennaiyin	Bambolim
19:30 IST			Rahim Ali (yellow card) 59'; Narayan Das (yellow card) 64'; Vladimir Koman (pen.) 66'	Stadium: GMC Athletic Stadium; Referee: Pranjal Banerjee; Man of the Match: Vladimir Koman

29 November 2021 2	NorthEast	1-2	Chennaiyin	Fatorda
19:30 IST	Khassa Camara (yellow card) 35'; Patrick Flottmann (yellow card) 40'; Mashoor Shereef (yellow card) 79'		Lallianzuala Chhangte 41'; Reagan Singh (yellow card) 56'; Anirudh Thapa 74'	Stadium: PJN Stadium; Referee: Ashwin; Man of the Match: Lallianzuala Chhangte

3 December 2021 3	Chennaiyin	0-0	East Bengal	Vasco
19:30 IST	Rahim Ali (yellow card) 55'; Slavko Damjanović (yellow card) 74'		Sourav Das (yellow card) 90'	Stadium: Tilak Maidan Stadium; Referee: Crystal John; Man of the Match: Hira Mondal

11 December 2021 4	ATK Mohun Bagan	1-1	Chennaiyin	Fatorda
19:30 IST	Liston Colaco 45'; Tiri (yellow card) 22'		Reagan Singh (yellow card) 25'; Vladimir Koman 45'	Stadium: PJN Stadium; Referee: Rahul Kumar Gupta; Man of the Match: Anirudh Thapa

15 December 2021 5	Mumbai City	1-0	Chennaiyin	Fatorda
19:30 IST	Rahul Bheke 86'		Lallianzuala Chhangte (yellow card) 39'; Anirudh Thapa (yellow card) 42'; Rahim Ali (yellow card) 90'	Stadium: PJN Stadium; Referee: A Rowman; Man of the Match: Rahul Bheke

18 December 2021 6	Chennaiyin	2-1	Odisha	Vasco
19:30 IST	Narayan Das (yellow card) 10'; Germanpreet Singh 23' (yellow card) 45'; Ariel Borysiuk (yellow card) 49'; Mirlan Murzaev 63'		Isaac Vanmalsawma (yellow card) 29'; Thoiba Singh (yellow card) 53'; Sebastian Thangmuansang (yellow card) 75'; Javi Hernández (yellow card) 86' (goal) 90'	Stadium: Tilak Maidan Stadium; Referee: Slavko Damjanović; Man of the Match: Pratik Mondal

22 December 2021 7	Chennaiyin	0-3	Kerala Blasters	Vasco
19:30 IST			Díaz 9'; Sahal 38'; Puitea (yellow card) 56'; Luna 79'	Stadium: Tilak Maidan Stadium; Attendance: Closed Doors; Referee: Crystal John; Man of the Match: Adrián Luna (Kerala Blasters)

30 December 2021 8	Chennaiyin	2-4	Bengaluru	Vasco
19:30 IST	Mirlan Murzaev 4'; Rahim Ali 49'		Prince Ibara (yellow card) 13'; Cleiton Silva (pen.) 39'; Alan Costa 43'; Ashique Kuruniyan (yellow card) 45'; Suresh Wangjam (yellow card) 57'; Udanta Singh 70'; Pratik Chowdhary 74'; Danish Farooq Bhat (yellow card) 80'	Stadium: Tilak Maidan Stadium; Referee: Rahul Kumar Gupta; Man of the Match: Naorem Roshan Singh

2 January 2022 9	Jamshedpur	0-1	Chennaiyin	Bambolim
21:30 IST	Narender Gahlot (yellow card) 22'; Ricky Lallawmawma (yellow card) 48'; Alex Lima (yellow card) 83'		Łukasz Gikiewicz 31' (yellow card) 84'	Stadium: GMC Athletic Stadium; Referee: Pranjal Banerjee; Man of the Match: Mohammad Sajid Dhot

8 January 2022 10	Goa	1-0	Chennaiyin	Bambolim
21:30 IST				Stadium: GMC Athletic Stadium

13 January 2022 11	Chennaiyin	1-1	Hyderabad	Margao
19:30 IST				Stadium: Fatorda Stadium

22 January 2022 12	Chennaiyin	v	NorthEast	Margao
19:30 IST				Stadium: Fatorda Stadium

== Squad statistics ==
	ISL	Super Cup	Total
Games played	20	0	20
Games won	5	0	5
Games drawn	5	0	5
Games lost	10	0	10
Goals scored	17	0	17
Goals conceded	35	0	35
Goal difference	-18	0	-18
Clean sheets	3	0	3
Yellow cards	13	0	13
Red cards	0	0	0

== Statistics ==
2021–22 Indian Super League season Statistics

=== Goal scorers ===
Rank	Player name	Matches	Goals
1	(Hungary) Vladimir Koman	9	2
1	(Kyrgyzstan) Mirlan Murzaev	9	2
2	(India) Lallianzuala Chhangte	9	1
2	(India) Anirudh Thapa	9	1
2	(India) Rahim Ali	9	1
2	(Poland) Łukasz Gikiewicz	9	1
2	(India) Germanpreet Singh	5	1

=== Assists ===
Rank	Player name	Matches	Assists
1	(Kyrgyzstan) Mirlan Murzaev	9	2
2	(India) Lallianzuala Chhangte	9	1
2	(Hungary) Vladimir Koman	9	1
2	(Poland) Łukasz Gikiewicz	9	1
2	(India) Germanpreet Singh	5	1

=== Yellow cards ===
Rank	Player name	Matches	Yellow Cards
1	(India) Rahim Ali	9	3
2	(India) Reagan Singh	9	2
2	(India) Narayan Das	9	2
4	(Serbia) Slavko Damjanović	9	1
4	(India) Lallianzuala Chhangte	9	1
4	(India) Anirudh Thapa	9	1
4	(Hungary) Ariel Borysiuk	9	1
4	(Poland) Łukasz Gikiewicz	9	1
4	(India) Germanpreet Singh	5	1
