= 2020–21 Chennaiyin FC season =

2020–21 season of Chennaiyin FC

Chennaiyin
2020–2021 season
- Owner: Abhishek Bachchan; MS Dhoni; Vita Dani
- Head Coach: Csaba László
- Stadium: GMC Athletic Stadium, Bambolim
- Indian Super League: 8th
- Top goalscorer: League: Isma; Lallianzuala Chhangte(4 goals); All: Isma; Lallianzuala Chhangte(4 goals)
- Highest home attendance: 🔒 Closed Doors
- Lowest home attendance: 🔒 Closed Doors
- Average home league attendance: 🔒 Closed Doors
- Biggest win: JFC 1–2 CFC (24 November 2020) FCG 1–2 CFC (19 December 2020) OFC 1–2 CFC (13 January 2021)
- Biggest defeat: CFC 1–4 HFC (4 January 2021)
Home colours	Away colours

The 2020–21 Chennaiyin FC season was the club's seventh season since its establishment in 2014 and their seventh season in the Indian Super League

== Technical staff ==
As of 28 October 2020

Coaching Staff

Position	Name
Head coach	(Hungary) Csaba László
Assistant Coach	(Bosnia and Herzegovina) Admir Kozlić
Assistant Coach	(India) Syed Sabir Pasha
Goalkeeping Coach	(Czech Republic) Martin Raška
Sports Scientist	(Slovakia) Csaba Gabris

Management Staff

Position	Name
Team Manager	(India) Arihant Jain
Reserve and Academy coach	(India) Santosh Kashyap
Chief Technical Officer(Scout)	(India) Amoy Ghoshal

Board of Directors

Position	Name
Owner	(India) MS Dhoni
Owner	(India) Abhishek Bachchan
Owner	(India) Vita Dani

== Players ==
Note: Flags indicate national team as defined under FIFA eligibility rules; some limited exceptions apply. Players may hold more than one non-FIFA nationality.

No.	Pos.	Nation	Player
1	GK	IND	Karanjit Singh
2	DF	IND	Reagan Singh
3	DF	IND	Lalchhuanmawia
5	DF	BIH	Enes Sipović
7	MF	IND	Lallianzuala Chhangte
8	DF	IND	Edwin Sydney Vanspaul
9	FW	SVK	Jakub Sylvestr
10	DF	BRA	Rafael Crivellaro (Captain; Injured in mid season)
11	MF	IND	Thoi Singh
13	DF	BRA	Eli Sabiá (Captain)
14	MF	ESP	**Manuel Lanzarote**
15	MF	IND	Anirudh Thapa (Vice Captain)
16	MF	IND	Sinivasan Pandiyan
17	MF	IND	Dhanpal Ganesh

No.	Pos.	Nation	Player
18	DF	IND	Jerry Lalrinzuala
19	MF	TJK	Fatkhullo Fatkhuloev
20	MF	BRA	Memo
21	MF	IND	Abhijit Sarkar
22	MF	IND	Deepak Tangri
23	DF	IND	Remi Aimol
24	FW	IND	Rahim Ali
26	GK	IND	BY Revanth
27	GK	IND	Samik Mitra
28	MF	IND	Germanpreet Singh
29	FW	IND	Aman Chetri
31	GK	IND	Vishal Kaith
35	DF	IND	Balaji Ganesan
36	DF	IND	Aqib Nawab
99	FW	GBS	Isma

In bold:Winter Transfer

== Transfer ==
=== Transfers in ===
Entry date	Pos.	No.	Player	From club	Transfer Type	Ref.
27 August 2020	GK	27	(India) Samik Mitra	(India) Indian Arrows	Free Transfer	
27 August 2020	FW	29	(India) Aman Chetri	(India) Chennaiyin FC II	N/A	
13 September 2020	DF	2	(India) Reagan Singh	(India) NorthEast United FC	Free Transfer	
13 September 2020	DF	3	(India) Lalchhuanmawia	(India) Odisha FC	Free Transfer	
21 September 2020	DF	5	(Bosnia and Herzegovina) Enes Sipović	(Qatar) Umm Salal SC	Free Transfer	
4 October 2020	DF	20	(Brazil) Memo	(India) Jamshedpur FC	Free Transfer	
11 October 2020	FW	99	(Guinea-Bissau) Esmaël Gonçalves	(Japan) Matsumoto Yamaga FC	Free Transfer	
15 October 2020	FW	19	(Tajikistan) Fatkhullo Fatkhuloev	(Tajikistan) FK Khujand	₹2.50M	
20 October 2020	FW	9	(Slovakia) Jakub Sylvestr	(Israel) Hapoel Haifa F.C.	Free Transfer	
28 October 2020	GK	26	(India) BY Revanth	(India) Chennaiyin FC II	N/A	
28 October 2020	DF	35	(India) Balaji Ganesan	(India) Chennaiyin FC II	N/A	
28 October 2020	DF	36	(India) Aqib Nawab	(India) Chennaiyin FC II	N/A	
11 January 2021	MF	14	(Spain) **Manuel Lanzarote**	(Spain) UE Sant Andreu	Free Transfer	

In bold:Winter transfer

=== Transfers out ===
Exit date	Pos.	No.	Player	To club	Transfer Type	Ref.
8 August 2020	FW	9	(Lithuania) Nerijus Valskis	(India) Jamshedpur	Free Transfer	
25 August 2020	FW	10	(Romania) Dragoș Firțulescu	Free Agent	-	
7 September 2020	DF	3	(India) Tondonba Singh	(India) Mumbai	Free Transfer	
3 September 2020	DF	26	(India) Laldinliana Renthlei	(India) Jamshedpur	Free Transfer	
7 September 2020	GK	33	(India) Sanjiban Ghosh	(India) Northeast	Free Transfer	
7 September 2020	DF	25	(India) Zohmingliana Ralte	(India) Sudeva	Free Transfer	
7 September 2020	MF	5	(Afghanistan) Masih Saighani	Free Agent	-	
8 September 2020	DF	6	(Romania) Lucian Goian	Free Agent	-	
8 September 2020	FW	12	(India) Jeje Lalpekhlua	(India) East Bengal	Free Transfer	
11 March 2021	FW	9	(Slovakia) **Jakub Sylvestr**	(Lithuania) Zalgiris	Free Transfer	
20 March 2021	FW	19	(Tajikistan) **Fatkhullo Fatkhuloev**	(Tajikistan) ZSKA Dushanbe	Free Transfer	

In bold:Winter Transfer

== Preseason and friendlies ==
Win Draw Loss Cancelled

Owing the COVID-19 pandemic, all the clubs including Chennaiyin FC couldn't have a proper preseason. The preseason time was cut short this season. The Chennaiyin began their preseason against one of their fellow Indian Super League opponent, Mumbai City FC on 2 November 2020.

2 November 2020 Friendly	(India) Chennaiyin	0–1	(India) Mumbai City	Goa, India
16:00 IST		Report	Le Fondre

8 November 2020 Friendly	(India) Chennaiyin	0–3	(India) Goa	Goa, India
16:00 IST		Report	Angulo; Rebello; Pereira

15 November 2020 Friendly	(India) Chennaiyin	2–1	(India) Odisha	Goa, India
16:00 IST	Thapa; Ali	Report	Pereira (pen)

== Competitions ==
=== Indian Super League ===
==== League table ====
Pos	Team	Pld	W	D	L	GF	GA	GD	Pts
6	Jamshedpur	20	7	6	7	21	22	−1	27
7	Bengaluru	20	5	7	8	26	28	−2	22
8	Chennaiyin	20	3	11	6	17	23	−6	20
9	East Bengal	20	3	8	9	22	33	−11	17
10	Kerala Blasters	20	3	8	9	23	36	−13	17

Source: Indian Super League
Rules for classification: 1) points; 2) head-to-head points; 3) head-to-head goal difference; 4) head-to-head goals scored; 5) goal difference; 6) number of goals scored; 7) fair play ranking; 8) drawing of lots

==== Result summary ====
Overall								Home						Away					
Pld	W	D	L	GF	GA	GD	Pts	W	D	L	GF	GA	GD	W	D	L	GF	GA	GD
20	3	11	6	17	23	−6	20	0	7	3	7	12	−5	3	4	3	10	11	−1

Last updated: 28 October 2020.

===== Results by round =====
Round	1	2	3	4	5	6	7	8	9	10	11	12	13	14	15	16	17	18	19	20
Ground	A	H	H	A	A	A	A	H	H	H	A	H	A	H	A	A	H	H	H	A
Result	W	D	L	L	D	W	D	D	L	D	W	D	L	D	L	D	L	D	D	D
Position	1	3	6	8	8	8	7	7	8	8	5	6	6	5	6	6	8	8	8	8

A = Away; H = Home; W = Win; D = Draw; L = Loss

Win Draw Loss Cancelled

==== Matches ====
24 November 2020 1	Jamshedpur	1–2	Chennaiyin	Vasco
19:30 IST	Valskis 37'	Report	Thapa 1'; Isma 26' (pen.); Crivellaro (yellow card) 43'; Kaith (yellow card) 69'; Tangri (yellow card) 70'	Stadium: Tilak Maidan Stadium; Attendance: 0 Referee: Santosh Kumar; Man of the Match: Anirudh Thapa (Chennaiyin)

29 November 2020 2	Chennaiyin	0–0	Kerala Blasters	Bambolim
19:30 IST	R. Singh (yellow card) 20'	Report	Koné (yellow card) 45'; Cidoncha (yellow card) 74'; Karuthadathkuni (yellow card) 83'	Stadium: GMC Athletic Stadium; Attendance: 0 Referee: Rahul Kumar Gupta; Man of the Match: Albino Gomes (Kerala Blasters)

4 December 2020 3	Chennaiyin	0–1	Bengaluru	Bambolim
19:30 IST	Sabia (yellow card) 21'; Crivellaro (yellow card) 48'; R. Singh (yellow card) 54'	Report	Chhetri 56' (pen.); Kuruniyan (yellow card) 7'; Wangjam (yellow card) 51'	Stadium: GMC Athletic Stadium; Attendance: 0 Referee: Rahul Kumar Gupta; Man of the Match: Suresh Singh Wangjam (Bengaluru)

9 December 2020 4	Mumbai City	2–1	Chennaiyin	Bambolim
19:30 IST	Santana 45+4' (yellow card) 90'; Le Fondre 74'; Dakshinamurthy (yellow card) 63'; M. Singh (yellow card) 66'; Boumous (yellow card) 88'	Report	Sylvestr 40'; G. Singh (yellow card) 42'; Sabia (yellow card) 45'; R. Singh (yellow card) 46'; Crivellaro (yellow card) 88'	Stadium: GMC Stadium; Attendance: 0 Referee: L Ajitkumar Meitei; Man of the Match: Mourtada Fall (MCFC)

13 December 2020 5	Northeast United	0–0	Chennaiyin	Vasco
17:00 IST	Machado (yellow card) 36'; Lambot (yellow card) 81'	Report		Stadium: Tilak Maidan Stadium; Attendance: 0 Referee: Tejas Nagvenkar; Man of the Match: khassa Camara (NEUFC)

19 December 2020 6	Goa	1–2	Chennaiyin	Margao
19:30 IST	Mendoza 9'; Rodrigues (yellow card) 56'		Crivellaro 5'; Tangri (yellow card) 9'; R. Singh (yellow card) 14'; Ali 53'; Sipovic (yellow card) 63'	Stadium: Fatorda Stadium; Attendance: 0 Referee: Harish Kundu; Man of the Match: Rafael Crivellaro (CFC)

26 December 2020 7	East Bengal	2–2	Chennaiyin	Vasco
19:30 IST	Steinmann 59', 68'; Maghoma (yellow card) 90'	Report	Chhangte 13'; Ali 64'	Stadium: Tilak Maidan Stadium; Attendance: 0 Referee: Harish Kundu; Man of the Match: Matti Steinmann (East Bengal)

29 December 2020 8	Chennaiyin	0–0	ATK Mohun Bagan	Bambolim
19:30 IST	Jerry (yellow card) 80'	Report	Pronay Halder (yellow card) 63'	Stadium: GMC Athletic Stadium; Attendance: 0 Referee: A Rowan; Man of the Match: Arindam Bhattacharya (ATK)

4 January 2021 9	Chennaiyin	1–4	Hyderabad	Bambolim
19:30 IST (UTC+05:30)	Ali (yellow card) 42'; Thapa 67'; Chhangte (yellow card) 87'; Memo (yellow card) 89'	Report	Chianese 50'; Narzary 53', 79'; Victor 74'	Stadium: GMC Stadium; Attendance: 0 Referee: Mb Santhosh Kumar; Man of the Match: Narzary (HFC)

10 January 2021 10	Chennaiyin	0–0	Odisha	Bambolim
17:00 IST	Enes Sipovic (yellow card) 24'; Jerry Lalrinzuala (yellow card) 41'	Report	Jacob Tratt (yellow card) 83'	Stadium: GMC Athletic Stadium; Attendance: 0 Referee: Crystal John; Man of the Match: Lallianzuala Chhangte (CFC)

13 January 2021 11	Odisha	1–2	Chennaiyin	Bambolim
19:30 IST	Shubham Sarangi (yellow card) 48'; Diego Mauricio 64'; Steven Taylor (yellow card) 90'; Cole Alexander (yellow card) 90+6'	Report	Isma; Jerry Lalrinzuala (yellow card) 57'; Ali (yellow card) 71'; Thoi Singh (yellow card) 79'; Enes Sipovic (yellow card) 88'	Stadium: GMC Athletic Stadium; Attendance: 0 Referee: Ranjit Baksi; Man of the Match: Anirudh Thapa (CFC)

18 January 2021 12	Chennaiyin	0–0	East Bengal	Bambolim
19:30 IST	Sabia (yellow card) 56'; Sylvestr (yellow card) 86'	Report	Chhetri (yellow card) 22' (yellow-red card) 31'; Das (yellow card) 89'	Stadium: GMC Athletic Stadium; Attendance: 0 Referee: Rahul Kumar Gupta; Man of the Match: Debjit Majumder (East bengal)

21 January 2021 13	ATK Mohun Bagan	1–0	Chennaiyin	Margao
19:30 IST	Carl McHugh (yellow card) 45+1'; Sumit Rathi (yellow card) 63'; Tiri (yellow card) 88'; Williams 90+1'	Report	Reagan Singh (yellow card) 82'	Stadium: Fatorda Stadium; Attendance: 0 Referee: A Rowan; Man of the Match: Williams (ATK)

25 January 2021 14	Chennaiyin	1–1	Mumbai City	Bambolim
19:30 IST	Bartholomew Ogbeche 21'; Ahmed Jahouh (yellow card) 75'; Rowllin Borges (yellow card) 90'	Report	Enes Sipovic (yellow card) 10'; Isma 76' (pen.)	Stadium: GMC Stadium; Attendance: 0 Referee: MB Santhosh Kumar; Man of the Match: Amey Ranawade (MCFC)

31 February 2021 15	Hyderabad	2–0	Chennaiyin	Vasco
17:00 IST	Sandaza 28'; Santana (yellow card) 66'; Chianese 83'; Alberg (yellow card) 90+6'	Report	Singh (yellow card) 11'; Memo (yellow card) 59'; Tangri (yellow card) 87'	Stadium: Tilak Maidan Stadium; Attendance: 0 Referee: A Rowan; Man of the Match: Rai (HFC)

5 February 2021 16	Bengaluru	0–0	Chennaiyin	Margao
19:30 IST	Ajith (yellow card) 21'; Pratik (yellow card) 80'	Report	Jerry (yellow card) 50'; Esmaël (yellow card) 84'; Thoi (yellow card) 87'	Stadium: Fatorda Stadium; Attendance: 0 Referee: Pranjal Banerjee; Man of the Match: Gurpreet Singh Sandhu (BFC)

10 February 2021 17	Chennaiyin	0–1	Jamshedpur	Bambolim
19:30 IST	Manuel Lanzarote (yellow card) 66'; Memo (yellow card) 68'	Report	Peter Hartley (yellow card) 74'; Enes Sipovic 90' (o.g.); Ricky Lallawmawma (yellow card) 90'	Stadium: GMC Stadium; Attendance: 0 Referee: Rahul Kumar Gupta; Man of the Match: Stephen Eze (JFC)

13 February 2021 18	Chennaiyin	2–2	Goa	Bambolim
19:30 IST	Jakub Sylvestr 13'; Chhangte 60'; Singh (yellow card) 70'; Manuel Lanzarote (yellow card) 79'; Edwin (yellow card) 90'	Report	Igor Angulo 19' (pen.); Jorge Ortiz (yellow card) 90'; Ishan Pandita 90'; Edu Bedia (yellow card) 90'	Stadium: GMC Stadium; Attendance: 0 Referee: Crystal John; Man of the Match: Ishan Pandita (FCG)

18 February 2021 19	Chennaiyin	3–3	NorthEast United	Bambolim
19:30 IST	Chhangte 8', 51'; Manuel Lanzarote 50' (pen.); Isma (yellow card) 83'; Anirudh Thapa (yellow card) 87'; Vishal Kaith (yellow card) 90+3'	Report	Khan 14'; Brown 43'; Luís Machado 90+4' (pen.); Mashoor Shereef (yellow card) 83'	Stadium: GMC Athletic Stadium; Attendance: 0 Referee: Banerjee Pranjal

21 February 2021 20	Kerala Blasters	1–1	Chennaiyin	Bambolim
19:30 IST	Hooper 29' (pen.); Jordan Murray (yellow card) 72'	Report	Memo (yellow card) 4'; Fatkhullo 10'; Enes Sipovic (yellow card) 31' (yellow-red card) 80'; Deepak Tangri (yellow card) 51' Thoi Singh (yellow card) 56' Vishal Kaith (yellow card) 90'	Stadium: GMC Athletic Stadium; Attendance: 0 Referee: Pratik Mondal; Man of the Match: Chhangte (CFC)

== Squad statistics ==
=== Squad statistics ===
	ISL	Super Cup	Total
Games played	20	0	20
Games won	3	0	3
Games drawn	11	0	11
Games lost	6	0	6
Goals scored	17	0	17
Goals conceded	23	0	23
Goal difference	-6	0	-6
Clean sheets	6	0	6
Yellow cards	46	0	46
Red cards	1	0	1

== Statistics ==
2020–21 Indian Super League Statistics

=== Goal scorers ===
Rank	Player name	Goals
1	(Guinea-Bissau) Isma	4
1	(India) Lallianzuala Chhangte	4
2	(India) Anirudh Thapa	2
2	(India) Rahim Ali	2
2	(Slovakia) Jakub Sylvestr	2
3	(Brazil) Rafael Crivellaro	1
3	(Spain) Manuel Lanzarote	1
3	(Tajikistan) Fatkhullo Fatkhuloev	1

=== Assists ===
Rank	Player name	Assists
1	(Slovakia) Jakub Sylvestr	4
2	(India) Edwin Vanspaul	2
3	(India) Lallianzuala Chhangte	1
3	(Brazil) Rafael Crivellaro	1
3	(Guinea-Bissau) Isma	1
3	(India) Reagan Singh	1

=== Yellow cards ===
Rank	Player name	Yellow Cards
1	(India) Reagan Singh	6
2	(India) Deepak Tangri	4
2	(Bosnia and Herzegovina) Enes Sipovic	4
2	(Brazil) Memo	4
2	(India) Jerry Lalrinzuala	4
3	(Brazil) Rafael Crivellaro	3
3	(India) Thoi Singh	3
3	(Brazil) Eli Sabia	3
3	(India) Vishal Kaith	3
4	(Spain) Manuel Lanzarote	2
4	(India) Germanpreet Singh	2
4	(India) Rahim Ali	2
4	(Guinea-Bissau) Isma	2
5	(India) Anirudh Thapa	1
5	(India) Edwin Sydney Vanspaul	1
5	(Slovenia) Jakub Sylvestr	1
5	(India) Lallianzuala Chhangte	1

=== Red cards ===
Rank	Player name	Red Cards
1	(Bosnia and Herzegovina) Enes Sipovic	1
