= Syed Suhail Pasha =

Indian footballer

Personal information
- Date of birth: 26 September 1999 (age 27)
- Place of birth: Chennai, Tamil Nadu, India
- Height: 1.80 m (5 ft 11 in)
- Position: Striker

Team information
- Current team: TRAU

Youth career
- Chennaiyin U18

Senior career*
Years	Team	Apps	(Gls)
2017–2019	Chennaiyin B	13	(1)
2019–2021	Chennai City	16	(1)
2021–2023	Chennaiyin	10	(0)
2023	TRAU	0	(0)
2023-	Rajasthan United FC	8	(1)
Total		47	(3)
- * Club domestic league appearances and goals as of 20:21, 10 December 2022 (UTC)

Syed Suhail Pasha (born 26 September 1999) is an Indian professional footballer who plays as a forward for I-League club TRAU.

== Career ==
He made his professional debut for the Chennai City F.C. against Aizawl F.C. on 17 December 2019, He was brought in the 59th minute as Chennai City drew 1–1.

== Personal life ==
Syed Suhail Pasha is the son of Chennaiyin FC's interim head coach Syed Sabir Pasha. He belongs to Chennai, Tamil Nadu. He said in an interview that Lallianzuala Chhangte was his favourite Chennayin FC player. Suhail is a fan of FC Barcelona.

== Career statistics ==
=== Club ===
As of 10 December 2022

Club	Season	League			Cup		AFC		Total	
Club	Season	Division	Apps	Goals	Apps	Goals	Apps	Goals	Apps	Goals
Chennaiyin B	2017–18	I-League 2nd Division	7	0	0	0	—		7	0
Chennaiyin B	2018–19	I-League 2nd Division	6	1	0	0	—		6	1
Chennaiyin B	Chennaiyin B total		13	1	0	0	0	0	13	1
Chennai City	2019–20	I-League	10	1	3 (Note: Appearance(s) in Durand Cup)	0	2 (Note: Appearance(s) in AFC Champions League) (Note: Appearance(s) in AFC Cup)	0	15	1
Chennai City	2020–21	I-League	6	0	0	0	—		6	0
Chennai City	Chennai City total		16	1	3	0	2	0	21	1
Chennaiyin	2021–22	Indian Super League	8	0	0	0	—		8	0
Chennaiyin	2022–23	Indian Super League	2	0	2	0	—		4	0
Chennaiyin	Chennaiyin total		10	0	2	0	0	0	12	0
TRAU	2022–23	I-League	0	0	0	0	—		0	0
Career total			39	2	5	0	2	0	46	2
