= Abdenasser El Khayati =

Dutch footballer (born 1989)

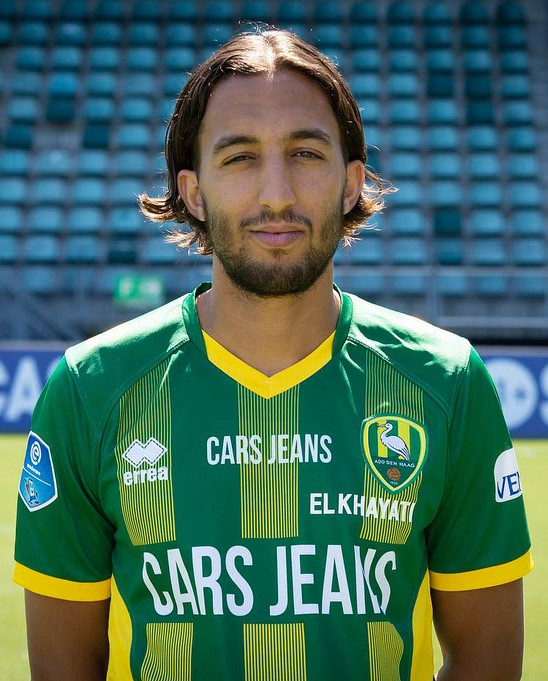
- El Khayati with ADO Den Haag in 2018

Personal information
- Full name: Abdenasser El Khayati
- Date of birth: 7 February 1989 (age 37)
- Place of birth: Rotterdam, Netherlands
- Height: 1.85 m (6 ft 1 in)
- Positions: Winger; forward

Youth career
- 2001–2004: Excelsior
- 2003–2004: Feyenoord
- 2004–2007: Leonidas
- 2007–2008: PSV

Senior career*
Years	Team	Apps	(Gls)
2008–2010	Den Bosch	12	(0)
2010–2011	NAC Breda	0	(0)
2012–2013	Olympiakos Nicosia	0	(0)
2014–2015	Kozakken Boys	17	(12)
2015–2016	Burton Albion	42	(11)
2016–2017	Queens Park Rangers	22	(1)
2017	→ ADO Den Haag (loan)	12	(5)
2017–2019	ADO Den Haag	65	(25)
2019–2020	Qatar SC	16	(1)
2021	ADO Den Haag	11	(2)
2022	Willem II	5	(0)
2022–2023	Chennaiyin	12	(9)
2023–2024	Mumbai City	9	(1)
2024–2026	Kozakken Boys	35	(10)
Total		258	(77)
- * Club domestic league appearances and goals

Abdenasser El Khayati (born 7 February 1989) is a Dutch former professional footballer who played as a winger or forward.

== Career ==
Born in Rotterdam, El Khayati progressed through the youth academy of Excelsior, before joining the Feyenoord youth team in 2003 as part of their cooperation with Excelsior. He later moved to the youth department of RKSV Leonidas. El Khayati spent his early senior career in the Netherlands and Cyprus with PSV, FC Den Bosch, NAC Breda, Olympiakos Nicosia and Kozakken Boys. He made his professional debut with Den Bosch in the Eerste Divisie on 3 October 2008, in a match against Excelsior.

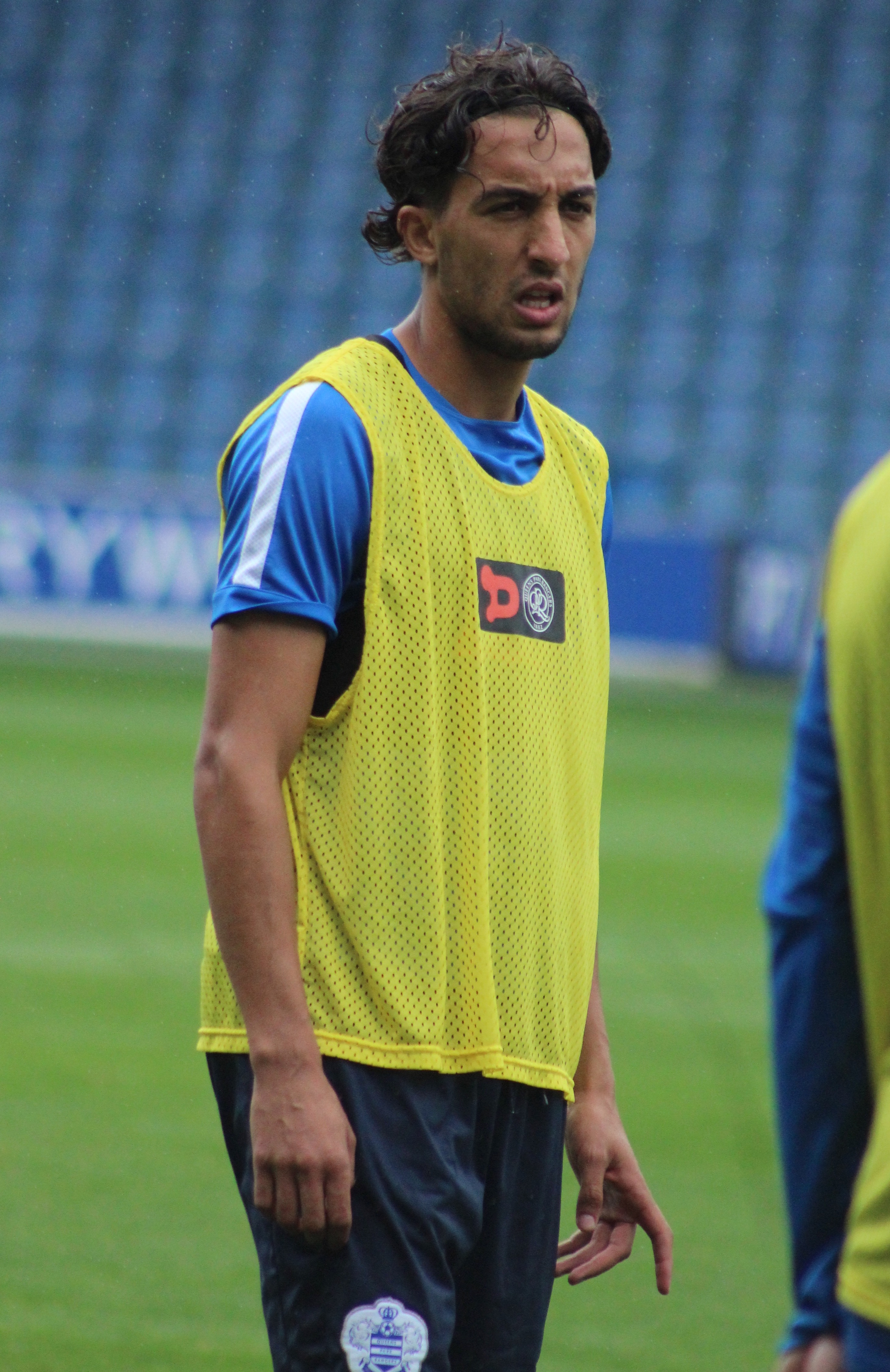
El Khayati training with Queens Park Rangers in 2016.

He signed for English club Burton Albion on 29 January 2015, before moving to Championship side Queens Park Rangers on a 2 1/2-year deal on 1 February 2016. He scored his first goal for QPR in a 2–1 home win against Charlton Athletic on 9 April 2016. He moved on loan to ADO Den Haag in January 2017. On 23 August 2017 his QPR contract was terminated by mutual consent. Shortly after his QPR contract was terminated, he joined ADO Den Haag on a three-year contract.

After growing into a key player for ADO, El Khayati signed with Qatar SC on a two-year contract on 15 August 2019. The transfer came after a 2018–19 season, where he scored 17 goals and had 12 assists in the Eredivisie. On 19 October 2020, El Khayati left Qatar after his contract was terminated by mutual consent, effectively making him a free agent. He finished his stint in Qatar with 16 league appearances in which he scored one goal.

He returned to ADO Den Haag on 6 February 2021, signing a short-term contract until the end of the season.

On 11 March 2022, El Khayati signed with Willem II until the end of the 2021–22 season. On 30 September 2022, he signed with Indian Super League side Chennaiyin ahead of their 2022–23 season.

On 8 September 2023, another Indian Super League club Mumbai City announced the signing of El Khayati, ahead of their second straight AFC Champions League campaign. El-Khayati made his ISL debut off the bench on 24 September 2023, away against NorthEast United FC.

On 4 December 2023, El Khayati scored his first goal for the club, being the club's only goal of their 2023–24 AFC Champions League campaign at home in a 2–1 loss against FC Navbahor, as Mumbai City were knocked out in the group stage. His second goal, and first ISL goal for the club, came in their next match against Bengaluru FC on 8 December 2023. He departed the club on 31 January 2024.

At the end of the 2025–26 season with Kozakken Boys, El Khayati announced his retirement from football.

== Personal life ==
El Khayati is of Moroccan descent.

== Career statistics ==
As of 25 January 2024

Appearances and goals by club, season and competition
Club	Season	League			National cup		League cup		Other		Total	
Club	Season	Division	Apps	Goals	Apps	Goals	Apps	Goals	Apps	Goals	Apps	Goals
Den Bosch	2008–09	Eerste Divisie	9	0	0	0	–		–		9	0
Den Bosch	2009–10	Eerste Divisie	3	0	0	0	–		–		3	0
Den Bosch	Total		12	0	0	0	–		–		12	0
NAC Breda	2010–11	Eredivisie	0	0	0	0	–		–		0	0
Olympiakos Nicosia	2012–13	Cypriot First Division	0	0	0	0	–		–		0	0
Kozakken Boys	2014–15	Topklasse	17	12	1	0	–		–		18	12
Burton Albion	2014–15	League Two	18	3	0	0	0	0	0	0	18	3
Burton Albion	2015–16	League One	24	8	1	0	1	0	0	0	26	8
Burton Albion	Total		59	24	1	0	1	0	0	0	62	23
Queens Park Rangers	2015–16	Championship	16	1	0	0	0	0	–		16	1
Queens Park Rangers	2016–17	Championship	6	0	0	0	3	0	–		9	0
Queens Park Rangers	Total		22	1	0	0	3	0	–		25	1
ADO Den Haag (loan)	2016–17	Eredivisie	12	5	0	0	–		–		12	5
ADO Den Haag	2017–18	Eredivisie	32	8	1	0	–		2	3	35	11
ADO Den Haag	2018–19	Eredivisie	33	17	2	3	–		–		35	20
ADO Den Haag	Total		65	25	3	3	–		2	3	70	31
Qatar SC	2019–20	Qatar Stars League	14	1	0	0	0	0	0	0	14	1
Qatar SC	2020–21	Qatar Stars League	2	0	0	0	0	0	0	0	2	0
Qatar SC	Total		16	1	0	0	0	0	0	0	16	1
ADO Den Haag	2020–21	Eredivisie	11	2	0	0	–		0	0	11	2
Willem II	2021–22	Eredivisie	5	0	0	0	–		0	0	5	0
Chennaiyin	2022–23	Indian Super League	12	9	1 (Note: Appearance(s) in Super Cup)	0	–		–		13	9
Mumbai City	2023–24	Indian Super League	9	1	4	1	–		3 (Note: Appearance(s) in AFC Champions League)	1	16	3
Career total			219	67	9	4	4	0	2	3	240	75

== Honours ==
Burton Albion

- Football League Two: 2014–15
