= Anirudh Thapa =

Indian footballer (born 1998)

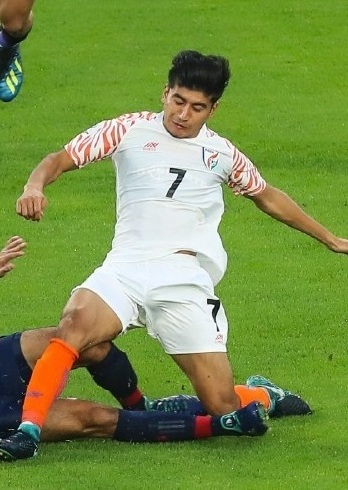
- Thapa playing for India at the 2019 AFC Asian Cup

Personal information
- Date of birth: 15 January 1998 (age 28)
- Place of birth: Dehradun, India
- Height: 1.69 m (5 ft 7 in)
- Position: Midfielder

Team information
- Current team: Mohun Bagan
- Number: 6

Youth career
- 2008–2012: St. Stephen's Academy
- 2012–2016: AIFF Elite Academy

Senior career*
| Years | Team | Apps | (Gls) |
| 2016–2023 | Chennaiyin | 103 | (8) |
| 2016–2017 | → Minerva Punjab (loan) | 14 | (1) |
| 2023– | Mohun Bagan | 92 | (3) |

International career^{‡}
| 2012–2014 | India U17 | 5 | (3) |
| 2014–2015 | India U19 | 4 | (2) |
| 2016–2017 | India U23 | 5 | (2) |
| 2017– | India | 62 | (5) |
Medal record
Men's football
Representing India
SAFF Championship
| Winner | 2021 Maldives |
| Winner | 2023 India |
- * Club domestic league appearances and goals as of 16:33, 22 November 2026 (UTC) ‡ National team caps and goals as of 22:00, 6 October 2026 (UTC)

Anirudh Thapa (born 15 January 1998) is an Indian professional footballer who plays as a midfielder for Indian Super League club Mohun Bagan and the India national team.

== Club career ==
=== Early life and youth career ===
Thapa was born in Dehradun, Uttarakhand, where he started his schooling at St. Joseph's Academy. He began playing football at the age of 10 at the St. Stephen's Football Academy in Chandigarh. After spending time with the India U14 side, he was selected to join the AIFF Regional Academy in Kalyani in 2012. As he moved up the national youth team ranks, Thapa moved into the AIFF Elite Academy where he became captain of the side in the I-League U19. In April 2016 Thapa, along with four other players, was selected to join French Ligue 2 side Metz on a short training stint which was sponsored by Indian Super League side Chennaiyin.

=== Indian Super League ===
==== Chennaiyin ====
On 1 July 2016, ISL club Chennaiyin signed Thapa along with four other players on a long-term deal. Thapa was named in the squad as a developmental player for the 2016 Indian Super League season. In November 2016, due to an injury to Dhanachandra Singh, which ruled the midfielder out for the rest of the season, Thapa joined the Chennaiyin squad as a replacement. He made his professional debut for the team on 1 December 2016, in his side's final match of the season against Goa. He started the match and played 67 minutes which ended in a 5–4 loss. He almost scored his first goal but unfortunately it was given as an own goal.

=== I-League ===
==== Minerva Punjab (loan) ====
On 27 December 2016, after the conclusion of the 2016 Indian Super League season, Thapa signed for Minerva Punjab of the I-League on loan for the 2016–17 I-League season. He made his debut for the club against Mohun Bagan on 17 January 2017 in a 4–0 loss. On 4 February 2017, he scored his first professional goal of his career against Mumbai in a 2–1 win, which also was the club's first ever win in the top flight. He made his last appearance for the club on 23 April 2017, against East Bengal. He finished the season with 1 goal while playing 14 matches, as the club finished second from bottom in the league, avoiding relegation to the I-League 2nd Division only by head-to-head points to Mumbai.

=== Return to Chennaiyin ===
==== 2017–18 season ====
Thapa returned to Chennaiyin on 31 May 2017, after his loan spell with Minerva Punjab. He was named in the squad for the 2017–18 Indian Super League season which commenced from 17 November 2017. He made his first appearance of the season against Pune City on 3 December 2017, coming on as a 76th-minute substitute for Bikramjit Singh in a 1–0 win. He scored his first goal for Chennaiyin against NorthEast United in a 3–1 loss. On 25 January 2018, he produced a man of the match performance against defending champions ATK for which he received great plaudits. Former Chennaiyin head coach John Gregory even stated Thapa "as the next big thing in Indian football". On 10 March 2018, he scored his second goal of the season against Goa in the 1st leg of the semi-final playoffs. He played in the final on 17 March 2018, against Bengaluru, coming on as a substitute as Chennaiyin won by the margin of 3–2, thus winning him his first league title.

==== 2018–19 season ====
After his breakthrough season, 2018–19 Indian Super League season was a learning curve for Thapa, who was a regular fixture in the starting line-up. Chennaiyin, with just nine points, finished a lowly 10th on the points table. His form, perhaps, took a hit because of the non-stop football he has played for the past 12 months. He played 18 matches for the club in that season, from which he started 12. He also made 8 appearances for the club in the 2019 AFC Cup, scoring a deflected goal against Abahani on 30 April 2019, but Chennaiyin failed to qualify from the group stage.

==== 2019–20 season ====
After a disappointing last season, Chennaiyin qualified for the playoffs by finishing 4th on the points table. Thapa was the centre of their resurgence as he amassed 1 goal and 6 assists during the 2019–20 Indian Super League season. However Chennaiyin lost in the final to ATK by the margin of 3–1 on 14 March 2020. After the conclusion of the season, Thapa stated that "he felt an improvement in his individual game".

==== 2020–21 season ====
On 24 November 2020, Thapa scored in the first league match of the 2020–21 Indian Super League, in 52 seconds against Jamshedpur to become the first Indian goal-scorer of the season. On 4 December 2020, he was injured and substituted in the 16th minute against Bengaluru. He took a knock to his right ankle He was forced to sit out the 2–1 loss against Mumbai City on 9 December 2020. Fortunately for the club, Thapa returned to full training ahead of its Indian Super League match against NorthEast United on 13 December 2020.

==== 2021-22 season ====
For the 2021–22 Indian Super League, Thapa was assigned as the captain of the club. On 29 November 2021, Thapa scored the winning goal against Northeast United as his team won 2–1.

=== Mohun Bagan ===
On 23 June 2023, Thapa left Chennaiyin, and joined fellow ISL club Mohun Bagan on a five-year-deal. The transfer fee was reported to be INR 3 crore.

== International career ==
Thapa first represented India at the U14 level. He was part of the U16 side that won the 2013 SAFF U16 Championship and participated in the qualifiers for the AFC U16 Championship. Thapa then went on to represent the U19 side in the SAFF U19 Championship.

On 6 January 2019, Thapa scored his first ever international goal in a 4–1 win against Thailand in the 2019 AFC Asian Cup. He scored the second goal against the same opponent in 2019 King's Cup which India won 1–0.

On 7 October 2026, Thapa scored against Uruguay in a friendly, equalising the fixture at 1–1. However, India went on to lose the game 6–1.

== Career statistics ==
=== Club ===
As of 22 November 2026

| Club | Season | League | | | National Cup | | Durand Cup | | Continental | | Others | | Total | |
| Club | Season | Division | Apps | Goals | Apps | Goals | Apps | Goals | Apps | Goals | Apps | Goals | Apps | Goals |
|---|---|---|---|---|---|---|---|---|---|---|---|---|---|---|
| Chennaiyin | 2016 | Indian Super League | 1 | 0 | — | | — | | — | | — | | 1 | 0 |
| Chennaiyin | 2017–18 | Indian Super League | 16 | 2 | 1 (Note: Appearance(s) in Super Cup) | 0 | — | | — | | — | | 17 | 2 |
| Chennaiyin | 2018–19 | Indian Super League | 18 | 0 | 5 | 2 | — | | 8 (Note: Appearance(s) in AFC Cup) | 1 | — | | 31 | 3 |
| Chennaiyin | 2019–20 | Indian Super League | 20 | 1 | — | | — | | — | | — | | 20 | 1 |
| Chennaiyin | 2020–21 | Indian Super League | 14 | 2 | — | | — | | — | | — | | 14 | 2 |
| Chennaiyin | 2021–22 | Indian Super League | 18 | 1 | — | | — | | — | | — | | 18 | 1 |
| Chennaiyin | 2022–23 | Indian Super League | 16 | 2 | 3 | 0 | 5 (Note: Appearance(s) in Durand Cup) | 2 | — | | — | | 24 | 4 |
| Chennaiyin | Chennaiyin Total | | 103 | 8 | 9 | 2 | 5 | 2 | 8 | 1 | 0 | 0 | 125 | 13 |
| Minerva Punjab (loan) | 2016–17 | I-League | 14 | 1 | — | | — | | — | | — | | 14 | 1 |
| Minerva Punjab (loan) | Punjab Total | | 14 | 1 | 0 | 0 | 0 | 0 | 0 | 0 | 0 | 0 | 14 | 1 |
| Mohun Bagan | 2023–24 | Indian Super League | 23 | 2 | — | | 4 | 0 | 7 | 0 | — | | 34 | 2 |
| Mohun Bagan | 2024–25 | Indian Super League | 18 | 0 | — | | 3 | 2 | 1 (Note: Appearance(s) in AFC Champions League Two) | 0 | — | | 22 | 2 |
| Mohun Bagan | 2025–26 | Indian Super League | 13 | 0 | 2 | 0 | 4 | 2 | 1 | 0 | 3 (Note: Appearance(s) in IFA Shield) | 0 | 23 | 2 |
| Mohun Bagan | 2026–27 | Indian Super League | 6 | 1 | 0 | 0 | 6 | 0 | — | | 1 (Note: Appearance(s) in Calcutta Football League) | 0 | 7 | 0 |
| Mohun Bagan | Mohun Bagan Total | | 60 | 3 | 2 | 0 | 17 | 4 | 9 | 0 | 4 | 0 | 86 | 6 |
| Career total | | | 171 | 11 | 11 | 2 | 22 | 6 | 17 | 1 | 4 | 0 | 225 | 20 |

=== International ===
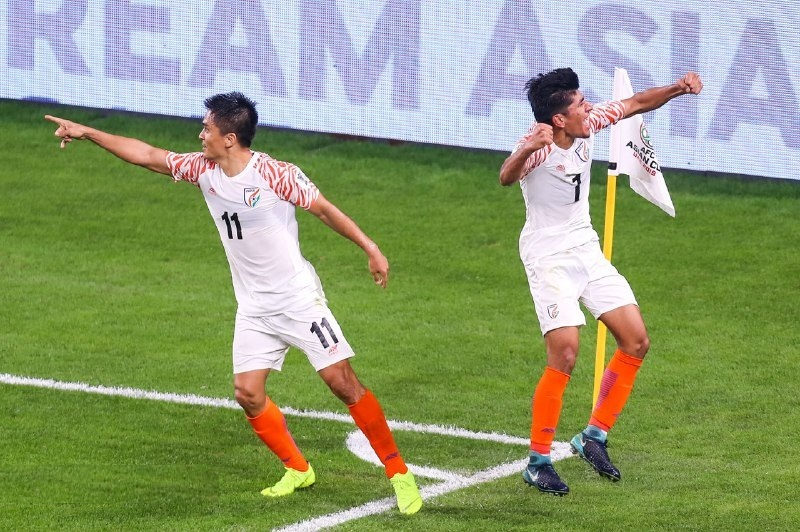
Thapa celebrating his goal with the captain Sunil Chhetri at 2019 AFC Asian Cup group match against Thailand.

As of 6 October 2026

| National team | Year | Apps | Goals |
|---|---|---|---|
| India | 2017 | 2 | 0 |
| India | 2018 | 12 | 0 |
| India | 2019 | 10 | 2 |
| India | 2021 | 8 | 1 |
| India | 2022 | 6 | 0 |
| India | 2023 | 15 | 1 |
| India | 2024 | 6 | 0 |
| India | 2025 | 0 | 0 |
| India | 2026 | 3 | 1 |
| Total | | 62 | 5 |

==== International goals ====
Scores and results list India's goal tally first.

| No. | Date | Venue | Cap | Opponent | Score | Result | Competition |
|---|---|---|---|---|---|---|---|
| 1. | 6 January 2019 | Al Nahyan Stadium, Abu Dhabi, United Arab Emirates | 15 | Thailand | 3–1 | 4–1 | 2019 AFC Asian Cup |
| 2. | 8 June 2019 | Chang Arena, Buriram, Thailand | 18 | Thailand | 1–0 | 1–0 | 2019 King's Cup |
| 3. | 2 September 2021 | Dasharath Rangasala, Kathmandu, Nepal | 26 | Nepal | 1–1 | 1–1 | Friendly |
| 4. | 22 March 2023 | Khuman Lampak Main Stadium, Imphal, India | 39 | Myanmar | 1–0 | 1–0 | Friendly |
| 5. | 6 October 2026 | Salt Lake Stadium, Kolkata, India | 62 | Uruguay | 1–1 | 1–6 | Friendly |

== Honours ==
Mohun Bagan

- Durand Cup: 2023
- Indian Super League Shield: 2023–24, 2024–25

Chennaiyin

- Indian Super League: 2017–18; runner-up 2019–20

India

- SAFF Championship: 2021; runner-up: 2018
- Tri-Nation Series: 2017, 2023
- Intercontinental Cup: 2018, 2023
- King's Cup third place: 2019

Individual

- AIFF Men's Emerging Footballer Of The Year: 2017–2018, 2019–20
- Indian Super League Hero of the Month: February 2023
