= Rahim Ali =

Indian footballer (born 2000)

Personal information
- Date of birth: 21 April 2000 (age 26)
- Place of birth: Ichapur, West Bengal, India
- Height: 1.79 m (5 ft 10 in)
- Position: Forward

Team information
- Current team: Odisha
- Number: 11

Youth career
- 2012–2016: Mohun Bagan
- 2016: AIFF Elite Academy

Senior career*
| Years | Team | Apps | (Gls) |
| 2017–2019 | Indian Arrows | 30 | (1) |
| 2019–2024 | Chennaiyin | 72 | (10) |
| 2024– | Odisha | 22 | (2) |

International career^{‡}
| 2017 | India U17 | 3 | (1) |
| 2017 | India U20 | 3 | (1) |
| 2019– | India U23 | 7 | (1) |
| 2021– | India | 22 | (1) |
Medal record
Representing India
SAFF Championship
| Winner | 2021 Maldives |
| Winner | 2023 India |
- * Club domestic league appearances and goals as of 16:43, 24 September 2024 (UTC) ‡ National team caps and goals as of 22:00, 6 October 2026 (UTC)

Rahim Ali (born 21 April 2000) is an Indian professional footballer who plays as a forward for Indian Super League club Odisha and the India national team.

== Early career ==
Born in Ichapur, West Bengal, Ali was part of the AIFF Elite Academy batch that was preparing for the 2017 FIFA U-17 World Cup to be hosted in India.

== Club career ==
=== Indian Arrows ===
After the 2017 FIFA U-17 World Cup, Ali was selected to play for the Indian Arrows, an All India Football Federation-owned team that would consist of India under-20 players to give them playing time. He made his professional debut for the side in the Arrows' first match of the season against Chennai City. He came on as a 73rd-minute substitute for Rahul Praveen as Indian Arrows won 3–0.

=== Chennaiyin ===
On 31 May 2019, Ali signed with Chennaiyin and appeared in the 2019–20 Indian Super League. They lost to Odisha on 6 January 2020 and won a game against Hyderabad by 3–1.

== International career ==
Ali represented the India under-17 side which participated in the 2017 FIFA U-17 World Cup.

Ali made his senior international debut for India against Nepal in a friendly on 2 September 2021 in their 1–1 draw. He later participated in 2021 SAFF Championship in Maldives, in which they emerged champions. In March 2022, Ali was included in the national squad by coach Igor Štimac ahead of India's two friendly matches against Bahrain and Belarus as preparations of 2023 AFC Asian Cup final round qualification.

== Career statistics ==
=== Club ===
As of 30 October 2024

| Club | Season | League | | | National cup | | Other | | Continental | | Total | |
| Club | Season | Division | Apps | Goals | Apps | Goals | Apps | Goals | Apps | Goals | Apps | Goals |
|---|---|---|---|---|---|---|---|---|---|---|---|---|
| Indian Arrows | 2017–18 | I League | 16 | 0 | 0 | 0 | 0 | 0 | — | | 16 | 0 |
| Indian Arrows | 2018–19 | I League | 14 | 1 | 1 | 0 | 0 | 0 | — | | 15 | 1 |
| Indian Arrows | Total | | 30 | 1 | 1 | 0 | 0 | 0 | 0 | 0 | 31 | 1 |
| Chennayin | 2019–20 | Indian Super League | 6 | 0 | 0 | 0 | 0 | 0 | — | | 6 | 0 |
| Chennayin | 2020–21 | Indian Super League | 16 | 2 | 0 | 0 | 0 | 0 | — | | 16 | 2 |
| Chennayin | 2021–22 | Indian Super League | 18 | 2 | 0 | 0 | 0 | 0 | — | | 18 | 2 |
| Chennayin | 2022–23 | Indian Super League | 15 | 3 | 3 | 2 | 4 | 1 | — | | 22 | 6 |
| Chennayin | 2023–24 | Indian Super League | 17 | 3 | 3 | 0 | 3 | 1 | — | | 23 | 4 |
| Chennayin | Total | | 72 | 10 | 6 | 2 | 7 | 2 | 0 | 0 | 85 | 14 |
| Odisha FC | 2024–25 | Indian Super League | 22 | 2 | 0 | 0 | 0 | 0 | — | | 22 | 2 |
| Career total | | | 124 | 13 | 7 | 2 | 7 | 2 | 0 | 0 | 138 | 17 |

=== International ===
As of 6 October 2026

| National team | Year | Apps | Goals |
|---|---|---|---|
| India | 2021 | 5 | 0 |
| India | 2022 | 1 | 0 |
| India | 2023 | 6 | 0 |
| India | 2024 | 2 | 0 |
| India | 2025 | 3 | 1 |
| India | 2026 | 5 | 0 |
| Total | | 22 | 1 |

List of international goals scored by Rahim Ali
| No. | Date | Venue | Opponent | Score | Result | Competition |
|---|---|---|---|---|---|---|
| 1 | 9 October 2025 | National Stadium, Kallang, Singapore | Singapore | 1–1 | 1–1 | 2027 AFC Asian Cup qualification |

== Honours ==
India

- SAFF Championship: 2021, 2023
- Intercontinental Cup: 2023
