= Samik Mitra =

Indian footballer (born 2000)

Personal information
- Date of birth: 1 December 2000 (age 25)
- Place of birth: West Bengal, India
- Position: Goalkeeper

Team information
- Current team: Chennaiyin
- Number: 1

Youth career
- AIFF Elite Academy
- East Bengal

Senior career*
Years	Team	Apps	(Gls)
2017–2018	Chennaiyin B	9	(0)
2018–2020	→ Indian Arrows (loan)	8	(0)
2020–	Chennaiyin	23	(0)
- * Club domestic league appearances and goals as of 16:00, 23 February 2026 (UTC)

Samik Mitra (Bengali: শমীক মিত্র; born 1 December 2000) is an Indian professional footballer who plays as a goalkeeper for Chennaiyin in the Indian Super League. He rose through ranks at Chennai and currently serves as their first choice goalkeeper.

== Career ==
=== Chennaiyin B ===
==== 2017-18: I-League 2nd Division debut ====
After graduating from AIFF Elite Academy Samik was signed by Chennaiyin B in October 2017. He made his debut against Langsning FC in 2017–18 I-League 2nd Division opener playing the full game in a 2–1 loss. He made five appearances for the B team in his first season all coming in league where his only clean sheet came against Jamshedpur B when he came on as a 62nd-minute substitute and did not concede in a 2–0 loss.

==== 2018–19: Loan to Indian Arrows ====
On 16 October 2018, he was sent on loan to Indian Arrows for 2018–19 I-League season. He made his debut and only appearance on 8 February 2019 against Chennai City FC at Kalinga Stadium which was also his I-League debut. He started and played full match as Indian Arrows lost 0–2. He returned from loan at the end of I-League season and played in the 2018–19 I-League 2nd Division opener against Fateh Hyderabad which ended in a 2–1 loss. He made four appearances for B team this season where his only clean sheet came against Ozone FC when he came on as 60th-minute substitute and did not concede in a 3–0 loss.

==== 2019-20: Durand Cup and loan to Indian Arrows ====
He was selected for the Chennaiyin team for the 2019 Durand Cup, which consisted of reserve team players. On 8 August, he made his debut against Gokulam Kerala which ended in a 4–0 loss. But he kept clean sheets in the next two games against TRAU and Indian Air Force which both ended in goalless draws. He joined Indian Arrows for another season on loan. He was in between the sticks in first game of the season against Gokulam Kerala which ended in a 1–0 loss. He started in six more games for Arrows but failed to keep any clean sheets. He played his last game of the season in a 1–0 loss to TRAU FC.

=== Chennaiyin FC ===
==== 2020–22: Contract Extension and Rise to First Team ====
On 27 August 2020, he signed a new multi-year contract with Remi Aimol and Aman Chetri. It was also confirmed that all these youngsters will be included in Chennaiyin's squad for 2020–21 ISL. Hence, he was included in ISL squad. He was the third-choice keeper behind Vishal Kaith and Karanjit Singh and only made it to matchday squad once. The following season, he was again third choice keeper but he made his ISL debut in the last league game against Mohun Bagan where he started and played full game as Chennaiyin lost 1–0. He got some gametime in RFDL where he captained the team in first two games.

==== 2022–23: Takeover as first choice keeper and Super Cup ====
He started the season as third choice keeper but eventually took over Debjit Majumder as first choice keeper in the middle of the ISL season. He started in ten ISL games and kept two clean sheets as Chennaiyin failed to qualify for playoffs. On 11 April 2023, he made Super Cup debut when he started and played full 4–2 win over NorthEast United FC. He kept his first clean sheet in the next game against Churchill Brothers which ended in a 0–0 stalemate.

== Career statistics ==
=== Club ===
As of 24 October 2023

Club	Season	League			Cup		AFC		Total	
Club	Season	Division	Apps	Goals	Apps	Goals	Apps	Goals	Apps	Goals
Chennaiyin B	2017–18	I-League 2nd Division	5	0	0	0	—		5	0
Chennaiyin B	2018–19	I-League 2nd Division	4	0	0	0	—		4	0
Chennaiyin B	2021–22	RFDL	3	0	0	0	—		3	0
Indian Arrows (loan)	2018–19	I-League	1	0	0	0	—		1	0
Indian Arrows (loan)	2019–20	I-League	7	0	0	0	—		7	0
Indian Arrows (loan)	Indian Arrows total		8	0	0	0	0	0	8	0
Chennaiyin	2019–20	Indian Super League	0	0	3 (Note: Appearance(s) in Durand Cup)	0	—		3	0
Chennaiyin	2020–21	Indian Super League	0	0	0	0	—		0	0
Chennaiyin	2021–22	Indian Super League	1	0	0	0	—		1	0
Chennaiyin	2022–23	Indian Super League	10	0	3 (Note: DurandCup)	0	—		13	0
Chennaiyin	2023–24	Indian Super League	3	0	2 (Note: DurandCup)	0	—		5	0
Chennaiyin	Chennaiyin total		14	0	8	0	0	0	22	0
Career total			34	0	8	0	0	0	42	0
