= Vishal Kaith =

Indian footballer (born 1996)

Personal information
- Full name: Vishal Kaith
- Date of birth: 22 July 1996 (age 30)
- Place of birth: Rohru, Himachal Pradesh, India
- Height: 1.87 m (6 ft 2 in)
- Position: Goalkeeper

Team information
- Current team: Mohun Bagan SG
- Number: 1

Youth career
- 2011–2014: AIFF Elite Academy

Senior career*
Years	Team	Apps	(Gls)
2014–2015	Shillong Lajong B	20	(0)
2014–2017	Shillong Lajong	68	(0)
2016-2017	→ Pune City (loan)	18	(0)
2017–2019	Pune City	44	(0)
2019–2022	Chennaiyin	64	(0)
2022–	Mohun Bagan	108	(0)

International career^{‡}
2013–2016	India U19	16	(0)
2017-2019	India U23	18	(0)
2018–	India	12	(0)
Medal record
Men's football
Representing India
SAFF Championship
Winner	2021 Maldives
Runner-up	2018 Bangladesh
- * Club domestic league appearances and goals as of 17:00, 12 April 2025 (UTC) ‡ National team caps and goals as of 17:00, 12 June 2025 (UTC)

Vishal Kaith (born 22 July 1996) is an Indian professional footballer who plays as a goalkeeper for Indian Super League club Mohun Bagan and the India national team.

== Early life and career ==
Having come up through the state level ranks for Himachal Pradesh, he was recruited by the AIFF to play for the under-16 and under-19 national sides before joining the AIFF Elite Academy in 2011 to play in the under-19 national league, before being picked up by Shillong Lajong.

== Club career ==
=== Shillong Lajong ===
Vishal Kaith joined Shillong Lajong on 21 July 2014 after spending a year at the AIFF Elite Academy. He played an important role in title winning run of the reserve team in Shillong Premier League and conceded just 10 goals from 17 games throughout the tournament. He made his official debut in the second game of his teams' 2014-15 Indian Federation Cup against Salgaocar and was adjudged as the Man of the Match despite a 2–1 loss.

Kaith would go on to obtain the Man of the Match award in his second first team appearance against Mohun Bagan despite a 1–0 loss. Kaith made his senior I-League debut on 28 March 2015 against Sporting Goa in a 1–1 draw but was sent off in the 50th minute for a handball outside the box.

Kaith showed good progress in pre-season for the new season and he became a pivotal part of the club. He started in the final of 2015 Shillong Premier League against Royal Wahingdoh on 21 November where he made a big mistake by throwing the ball to Royal Wahingdoh Forward, Nagen Tamang which resulted in an equaliser but Lajong managed to win the final 2–1 in extra time.

He started in the first match of 2015-16 I-League season against Mumbai FC which ended in a 0–0 stalemate. This was Vishal's first ever cleansheet on professional level Under the guidance of Thangboi Singto, Kaith became the first choice goalkeeper for Shillong Lajong in entire season. He started in fifteen games and kept five important clean sheets with Shillong finish sixth in league.

He also played in Lajong's all four games in 2015–16 Indian Federation Cup where Lajong defeated East Bengal in first leg of quarterfinals 2–1 and second leg ended in a 2–2 draw after extra time. Lajong lost to Mohun Bagan in first leg of semi-finals 5–0 and second leg ended in a 0–0 draw.

==== Loan To Pune City ====
On 25 May 2016, Indian Super League club Pune City signed Kaith on loan from Shillong Lajong for the third edition of Indian Super League where he was third choice keeper and made no appearances during the season.

==== Return from loan and departure ====
He returned to Lajong ahead of 2016-17 I-League season. He made his competitive return in Lajong colours in a 3–0 loss to defending champions Bengaluru FC. He played in all league games and kept three cleansheets. Lajong ended their campaign with a 1–1 draw to eventual champions Aizawl FC. He also played in all group games of Federation Cup where first two games ended in a 3–2 loss to Bengaluru FC and Mohun Bagan respectively. He received a straight red card in the seventy fifth minute of last group game against DSK Shivajians which ended in a 3–2 win but not enough to help Lajong qualify for semifinals.

=== Pune City ===
On 7 July 2017, Vishal Kaith signed for FC Pune City permanently with the transfer fee reported to be 80 lakh Indian Rupees. He made his Indian Super League debut on 3 December 2017 in a 1–0 loss to Chennaiyin. 7 days later, he kept his first cleansheet in next game against Jamshedpur in a 1–0 away win. He started in both legs of semifinal against Bengaluru FC where the first leg ended in a goalless draw and second leg in a 3–1 loss.

He kept 7 cleansheets in 17 games in the league. He also started in the 3–2 loss to his former club Shillong Lajong in round of 16 of inaugural Super Cup. The next season, he missed the pre season due to national duty. He played his first game of the season in a 1–1 draw to Delhi Dynamos which was the first game of 2018–19 ISL season. After starting in first four league games, he lost his number one spot to Kamaljit Singh and failed to make any more appearance.

=== Chennaiyin ===
On August 31, 2019, Vishal Kaith signed for Chennaiyin on a long-term permanent deal with the club after spending the previous three seasons at Pune City. He made his debut for Chennaiyin on 23 October 2019 in a 3–0 loss to FC Goa. 4 days later, he kept his first cleansheet in a 0–0 stalemate against Mumbai City.

Chennai finished fourth in regular season and qualified for semifinals. He started in both the legs against Goa as Chennai won first leg 4–1 and lost second leg 4–2 but qualified for final on a 6–5 aggregate score. He was in between the sticks in the 2020 ISL final as Chennai lost to ATK 3–1 at Fatorda Stadium. This was Vishal's first ever major final. He kept 4 cleansheets in 20 appearances in the season.

He played his first game of 2020-21 ISL season in a 2–1 win against Jamshedpur on 24 November 2020. 5 days later, he kept his first cleansheet of the season in a goalless draw against Kerala Blasters. On 4 January 2021, He played his 50th ISL match against Hyderabad FC which ended in a 4–1 loss. He kept six cleansheets in twenty appearances in the season. He started the 2021-22 ISL season with a cleansheet against Hyderabad in a 1–0 win. He soon lost his first choice custodian place to Debjit Majumder and ended the season with only two cleansheets in nine appearances. He departed Chennai at the end of the season after spending three seasons.

=== Mohun Bagan SG ===
==== 2022–23: ISL Champion and AFC Cup ====
In June 2022, Vishal Kaith signed for Mohun Bagan SG on a three-year deal. He made his debut in a 1–1 draw against Mumbai City in Durand Cup on 24 August. 4 days later, he kept his first cleansheet for The Mariners in a 1–0 Kolkata Derby victory over arch rivals East Bengal. 2 weeks later, he made his continental debut in 3–1 loss to Kuala Lumpur City in Inter-zone play-off semi-finals of AFC Cup. He played his first ISL game in 2–1 loss to his former club Chennaiyin where he gave away a penalty to Kwame Karikari which costed a goal.

Mohun Bagan finished third in regular season and managed to qualify for playoffs. He felt unconscious after a collision with Diego Mauricio where the elbow of latter crashed into the former. The situation reached such a stage that an ambulance entered the pitch with great speed. Despite Kaith saying "I am okay", he was subbed off, left the field on feet and sent to hospital for scans in an eventual 2–0 win over Odisha FC in knockout round. He recovered from every possible injury and started in both legs of semifinal against Hyderabad FC which both ended goalless. He saved two penalties in the 4–3 shootout victory and was adjudged with Hero of the match award.

He started in 2023 ISL final against Bengaluru FC on 18 March 2023 which was his second, the first one being in 2020. The match went into shootout after a 2–2 draw. Vishal once again became a hero and saved two penalties in 4–3 shootout win guiding his team to first ever ISL Trophy. He was awarded with golden glove for keeping 12 cleansheets in 24 appearances which was the highest in the league. He was also named in the ISL Team Of The Season. He also started in 3–0 and 1–0 losses to Jamshedpur and Goa respectively in Super Cup.

He ended the season in Indian club qualifiers for 2023–24 AFC competitions where he registered his third shootout victory in 4–3 win over Hyderabad after a 1–1 draw helping his team seal AFC Cup qualifying play-off spot. He was named as Mohun Bagan Player of the Year(Shibdas Bahaduri Award) for keeping 14 cleansheets in 31 appearances in the season and making many stellar saves.

==== 2023–Present: Durand Cup, ISL 100th and Mohun Bagan 50th Appearance ====
He started the season with a cleansheet against Punjab FC in a 2–0 win in Durand Cup. He started in the 2023 Durand Cup final against rivals East Bengal. He was heavily tested by Nandhakumar Sekar and other forwards but he saved all six shots on target and kept a cleansheet in an eventual 1–0 victory in the Kolkata Derby. He won the golden glove of the tournament for keeping two cleansheets and conceding only three goals.

He kept his first AFC Cup cleansheet in opening group stage match against Odisha FC in a 4–0 win at Kalinga Stadium on 19 September. He played his first 2023–24 ISL game against newly promoted Punjab FC in a 3–1 win and kept his first cleansheet in next game against Bengaluru which ended in a 1–0 win. He played his 100th ISL match in a 2–2 draw against Odisha on 6 December and then started in the next game which was his 50th Mohun Bagan game against NorthEast United FC which ended in a 3–1 win.

In 2024, Mohun Bagan announced that Kaith had extended his contract till 2029. Speaking after signing his contract, Kaith said that he wanted to retire at Mohun Bagan, because of his love for the club and its fans.

== International career ==
=== Youth ===
Kaith was handed his India U19 debut on 4 October 2013 against Qatar U19 in 2014 AFC U-19 Championship Qualifiers. Kaith kept first clean sheet for India U19 against Nepal U19, in which India U19 defeated Nepal U19 by 1–0. In July 2017, Kaith represented India U23 in AFC U23 Championship Qualifiers which held in Qatar.

=== Senior ===
Kaith received his maiden call-up for Indian team camp for AFC Asian Cup Qualifiers match against Kyrgyzstan on 13 June 2017. After being named in squad multiple times as a backup keeper, he was named as the first choice keeper for 2018 SAFF Championship as team manager Stephen Constantine decided for field a young squad. He played in all games where he got his first cleansheets in group games against Sri Lanka and Maldives where both ended in a 2–0 win. He conceded his first goal in semifinal 3–1 win over arch-rivals Pakistan. India lost in the final to Maldives 2–1. He was named in squad for 2019 AFC Asian Cup and was on bench in all games. He was a part of the team which won 2021 SAFF Championship.

After a spell out of the national team, Kaith was recalled to the national team for matches against Maldives and Bangladesh in the March 2025 FIFA Window. Kaith played the full 90 minutes against Maldives, keeping a clean sheet in an eventual 3–0 win. With this appearance, Kaith also broke the record for the longest gap between two appearances for a player in Indian senior men's team history, with 2,377 days between his last appearance in September 2018 to his appearance against Maldives in 2025.

== Style of play ==
Kaith is a talented and often instinctive goalkeeper, who is recognized for his reflexes, goalkeeping technique, reactions, and ability to get to ground quickly to collect, parry, or even challenge for the ball with his feet; when playing in teams that rely upon high defensive lines, he has often functioned as a sweeper-keeper, frequently rushing out of his area to clear the ball or face opponents who have beaten the offside trap.

== Career statistics ==
=== Club ===
As of 5 November 2026

Club	Season	League			Cup		AFC		Durand Cup		Other(s)		Total	
Club	Season	Division	Apps	Goals	Apps	Goals	Apps	Goals	Apps	Goals	Apps	Goals	Apps	Goals
Shillong Lajong B	2014–15	Shillong Premier League	17	0	—								17	0
Shillong Lajong B	2015–16	Shillong Premier League	3	0	—								3	0
Shillong Lajong B	Total		20	0	0	0	0	0	0	0	0	0	20	0
Shillong Lajong	2014–15	I-League	1	0	2 (Note: Appearance(s) in Federation Cup)	0	—						3	0
Shillong Lajong	2015–16	I-League	15	0	4	0	—						19	0
Shillong Lajong	2016–17	I-League	18	0	3	0	—						21	0
Shillong Lajong	Total		34	0	9	0	0	0	0	0	0	0	43	0
Pune City (loan)	2016	Indian Super League	0	0	—								0	0
Pune City	2017–18	Indian Super League	17	0	1 (Note: Appearance(s) in Super Cup)	0	—						18	0
Pune City	2018–19	Indian Super League	4	0	0	0	—						4	0
Pune City	Total		21	0	1	0	0	0	0	0	0	0	22	0
Chennaiyin	2019–20	Indian Super League	20	0	—								20	0
Chennaiyin	2020–21	Indian Super League	20	0	—								20	0
Chennaiyin	2021–22	Indian Super League	9	0	—								9	0
Chennaiyin	Total		49	0	0	0	0	0	0	0	0	0	49	0
Mohun Bagan	2022–23	Indian Super League	24	0	2	0	1 (Note: Appearance(s) in AFC Cup)	0	3 (Note: Appearance(s) in Durand Cup)	0	1 (Note: Appearance in play-off for AFC Cup qualifying play-off)	0	31	0
Mohun Bagan	2023–24	Indian Super League	25	0	0	0	7	0	5	0	0	0	37	0
Mohun Bagan	2024–25	Indian Super League	26	0	0	0	1 (Note: Appearances in ACL Two)	0	4	0	0	0	31	0
Mohun Bagan	2025–26	Indian Super League	13	0	3	0	1	0	4 (Note: Appearances in Durand Cup)	0	2 (Note: Appearance(s) in IFA Shield)	0	23	0
Mohun Bagan	2026–27	Indian Super League	5	0	0	0	—		5 (Note: Appearances in Durand Cup)	0	5 (Note: 1 Appearance in Calcutta Football League and 4 Appearance(s) in 2026 IFA Shield)	0	15	0
Mohun Bagan	Total		93	0	5	0	10	0	21	0	8	0	137	0
Career total			217	0	15	0	10	0	21	0	8	0	271	0

=== International ===
As of 12 June 2025

National team	Year	Apps	Goals
India	2018	4	0
India	2025	4	0
Total		8	0

== Honours ==
Shillong Lajong

- Shillong Premier League: 2014, 2015

Mohun Bagan

- Indian Super League Shield: 2023–24, 2024–25
- Durand Cup: 2023
- Indian Super League Cup: 2022–23, 2024–25
- IFA Shield: 2025, 2026
- Calcutta Football League: 2026

India

- Intercontinental Cup: 2018
- SAFF Championship: 2021

Individual

- Indian Super League Golden Glove: 2022–23, 2024–25
- Shibdas Bhaduri Award (Mohun Bagan Best Player): 2023
- Durand Cup Golden Glove: 2023
- Indian Super League Team of the Season: 2022–23, 2023–24, 2024–25
