= Ajith Kumar (footballer) =

Indian footballer

Personal information
- Full name: Ajith Kumar Kamraj
- Date of birth: 13 November 1996 (age 29)
- Place of birth: Chennai, India
- Height: 1.77 m (5 ft 9 1/2 in)
- Position: Right-back

Team information
- Current team: Diamond Harbour
- Number: 33

Senior career*
Years	Team	Apps	(Gls)
2018–2020	Chennai City	34	(0)
2020–2022	Bengaluru	13	(0)
2022–2024	Chennaiyin	17	(0)
2024	Churchill Brothers	9	(0)
2024	Malappuram	6	(0)
2024–	Diamond Harbour	12	(0)
- * Club domestic league appearances and goals

Ajith Kumar Kamraj (born 13 November 1996) is an Indian professional footballer who plays as a defender for Diamond Harbour.

== Career ==
=== Chennai City ===
Kumar started his career with Chennai City FC in 2018.

=== Bengaluru FC ===
Kumar later joined Bengaluru FC on 22 August 2020 on a three-year deal for an undisclosed transfer fee.

== Career statistics ==
=== Club ===
As of 28 July 2025

Club	Season	League			Cup		AFC		Total	
Club	Season	Division	Apps	Goals	Apps	Goals	Apps	Goals	Apps	Goals
Chennai City	2018–19	I-League	20	0	3 (Note: Appearance(s) in Super Cup)	0	—		23	0
Chennai City	2019–20	I-League	14	0	3 (Note: Appearance(s) in Durand Cup)	0	2 (Note: Appearance(s) in AFC Champions League) (Note: Appearance(s) in AFC Cup)	0	19	0
Chennai City	Total		34	0	0	0	2	0	36	0
Bengaluru	2020–21	Indian Super League	8	0	0	0	—		8	0
Bengaluru	2021–22	Indian Super League	5	0	5	0	4	0	14	0
Bengaluru	Total		13	0	5	0	4	0	22	0
Chennaiyin	2022–23	Indian Super League	15	0	5	0	—		20	0
Chennaiyin	2023–24	Indian Super League	2	0	4	0	—		6	0
Chennaiyin	Total		17	0	9	0	0	0	26	0
Churchill Brothers	2023–24	I-League	9	0	0	0	—		9	0
Malappuram	2024	Super League Kerala	6	0	0	0	—		6	0
Diamond Harbour	2024–25	I-League 2	12	0	0	0	—		12	0
Diamond Harbour	2025–26	I-League	0	0	1	0	—		1	0
Diamond Harbour	Total		12	0	1	0	0	0	13	0
Career total			91	0	21	0	6	0	118	0

== Honours ==
Chennai City

- I-League: 2018–19
