= Aimol Reamsochung =

Indian footballer (born 2000)

Personal information
- Full name: Aimol Chongompipa Reamsochung
- Date of birth: 14 February 2000 (age 26)
- Place of birth: Manipur, India
- Height: 1.69 m (5 ft 6 1/2 in)
- Position: Right back

Team information
- Current team: NEROCA
- Number: 6

Youth career
- Chennaiyin

Senior career*
Years	Team	Apps	(Gls)
2017–2021	Chennaiyin	1	(0)
2017–2019	Chennaiyin B	14	(0)
2018–2019	→ Indian Arrows (loan)	3	(0)
2022	Real Kashmir	9	(0)
2022–	NEROCA	15	(0)
- * Club domestic league appearances and goals as of 17:22, 5 February 2023 (UTC)

Aimol Chongompipa Reamsochung (born 14 February 2000), commonly known by his nickname Remi, is an Indian footballer who plays as a defender for NEROCA in the I-League.

== Club career ==
=== NEROCA ===
In July 2022, Remi signed with I-League club NEROCA. On 18 August, he made his debut for the club in the Imphal Derby against TRAU in the Durand Cup, which ended in a 3–1 win.

== Career statistics ==
=== Club ===
As of 5 February 2023

Club	Season	League			Cup		AFC		Total	
Club	Season	Division	Apps	Goals	Apps	Goals	Apps	Goals	Apps	Goals
Chennaiyin	2018–19	Indian Super League	0	0	0	0	1 (Note: Appearance(s) in AFC Cup)	0	1	0
Chennaiyin	2019–20	Indian Super League	1	0	3 (Note: Appearance(s) in Durand Cup)	0	–		4	0
Chennaiyin	Chennaiyin total		1	0	3	0	1	0	5	0
Chennaiyin B	2017–18	I-League 2nd Division	9	0	0	0	–		9	0
Chennaiyin B	2018–19	I-League 2nd Division	5	0	0	0	–		5	0
Chennaiyin B	Chennaiyin B total		14	0	0	0	0	0	14	0
Indian Arrows (loan)	2018–19	I-League	3	0	0	0	–		3	0
Real Kashmir	2021–22	I-League	9	0	0	0	–		9	0
NEROCA	2022–23	I-League	15	0	4	0	–		19	0
Career total			42	0	7	0	1	0	50	0
