= Lallianzuala Chhangte =

Indian footballer (born 1997)

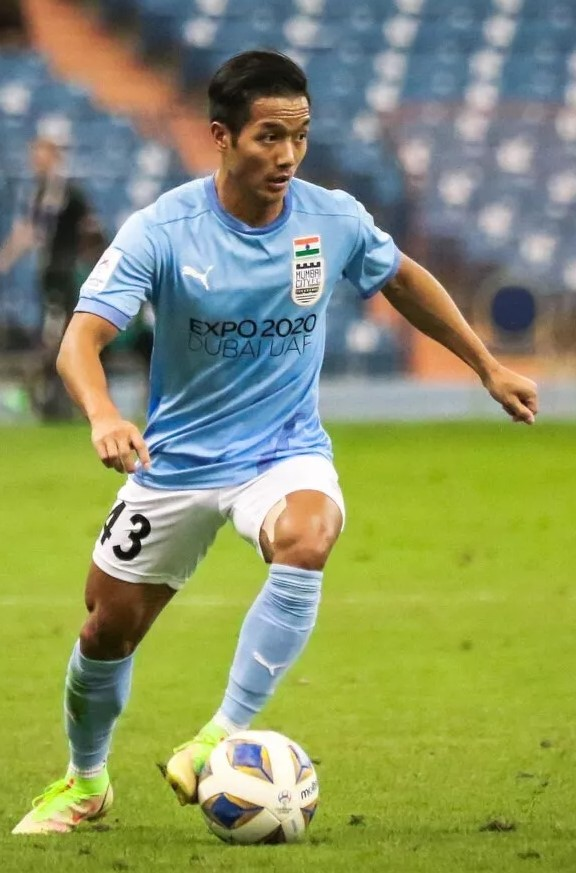
- Chhangte playing for Mumbai City in 2022

Personal information
- Full name: Lallianzuala Chhangte
- Date of birth: 8 June 1997 (age 29)
- Place of birth: Lunglei, Mizoram, India
- Height: 1.66 m (5 ft 5 in)
- Position: Winger

Team information
- Current team: Mohun Bagan

Youth career
- 2014–2016: DSK Shivajians

Senior career*
Years	Team	Apps	(Gls)
2016–2017	DSK Shivajians	20	(1)
2016	→ NorthEast United (loan)	1	(0)
2017–2019	Delhi Dynamos	38	(8)
2019–2022	Chennaiyin	53	(12)
2022	→ Mumbai City (loan)	13	(0)
2022–2026	Mumbai City	111	(42)
2026–	Mohun Bagan	8	(1)

International career^{‡}
2015	India U19	4	(2)
2015–2019	India U23	9	(5)
2015–	India	55	(9)
Medal record
Men's football
Representing India
SAFF Championship
Winner	2015 India
Winner	2023 India
South Asian Games
Silver medal – second place	2016 India
CAFA Nations Cup
Third place	2025 Tajikistan–Uzbekistan	Team
- * Club domestic league appearances and goals as of 16:25, 22 November 2026 (UTC) ‡ National team caps and goals as of 20:00, 9 June 2026 (UTC)

Lallianzuala Chhangte (born 8 June 1997) is an Indian professional footballer who plays as a forward for Indian Super League club Mohun Bagan and the India national team.

Chhangte began his professional senior career with DSK Shivajians. In 2016, he was loaned out to NorthEast United. In 2017, he joined Delhi Dynamos, where he rose to prominence. He signed for Chennaiyin in 2019. He joined Mumbai City on loan in January 2022 and later signed a permanent contract in June. Chhangte won his first Indian Super League title and Player of the League in the 2022–23 season. He was an integral part of Mumbai City's 2023–24 ISL Cup win with 16 goal contributions.

Chhangte made his international debut in 2015. He won the 2022–23 AIFF Men's Player of the Year award.

== Club career ==
=== Youth career ===
Lallianzuala was picked up by DSK Shivajians's Liverpool International Football Academy in 2014 to play for their under-18 team's debut season in the 2014–15 I-League U19 season. He finished the season as the top scorer in the league with 16 goals and helped his team qualify for the final round, where they finished in the 7th position. Impressed with his form, India U19's coach Lee Johnson called him up to represent the AIFF in the 2015 Asia U18 Champions Trophy, where the team reached the semi-finals before losing to Japan's Kashima Antlers over two legs. He was retained by DSK to play in the re-formatted 2015–16 I-League U18, where he helped his team qualify for the final round again with 9 goals in his name from the Maharashtra zone. DSK finished 3rd in the final round of the playoffs, where he scored 2 more goals, thus taking his tally to 11 for the season.

In March 2016, Lallianzuala along with his club teammate, Jerry Mawihmingthanga trained at Liverpool F.C.'s youth academy at Kirkby after impressing the youth coaches at DSK's LFC academy in India.

=== NorthEast United ===
Even though Chhangte signed his first professional contract with DSK Shivajians, he was loaned to NorthEast United FC to make his professional debut in the 2016 Indian Super League. He made one appearance for the club, coming on as a 74th minute substitute against Mumbai City FC on 5 November 2016. The match ended in a 0–1 defeat for NorthEast United. After the club failed to qualify for the playoffs, Chhangte returned to DSK Shivajians.

=== DSK Shivajians ===
Chhangte returned to DSK Shivajians after his loan spell at NorthEast United for the 2016–17 I-League season. He made his debut for the club against Mumbai FC on 8 January 2017, which DSK lost 1–0. He scored his first professional goal for DSK Shivajians on 11 March, in the side's reverse fixture against Mumbai FC. Chhangte scored his goal in the 67th minute of the game, after coming in as a substitute for Sumeet Passi. DSK went on to win the match 5–0. Chhangte played his last match for DSK on 20 April against Minerva Punjab, which ended in a 4–4 draw.

=== Delhi Dynamos ===
For 2017–18 Indian Super League he was picked by Delhi Dynamos (now Odisha FC) from the draft for 27 lakh rupees. He scored on his debut in the club's first match of the season against Pune City on 22 November 2017, which they ended up winning 2–3. Chhangte scored his second goal of the season on 14 January 2018 in a 2–0 victory over Bengaluru. He scored his third goal of the season against Mumbai City on 27 February, which the side won 5–1. Chhangte scored the final goal of the match. Chhangte thus ended his 2017–18 season with three goals.

Chhangte stayed at the club for the 2018–19 Indian Super League. He played his first match of the season against Pune City in the club's opening match of the season on 3 October 2018, which ended in a 1–1 draw. He scored his first goal of the season against Jamshedpur FC on 4 November, which ended in a 2–2 draw. Chhangte scored his second goal of the season on 8 November in a 3–2 defeat against FC Goa. He scored again on 3 December against Mumbai City, where he opened the scoresheet in the 3rd minute of the game. However, Delhi went on to lose the fixture as they conceded four goals later, resulting in a 2–4 defeat. Chhangte scored his fourth goal of the season on 12 December in 2–1 loss to Jamshedpur. Chhangte scored his last goal of the season and last goal for Delhi against Pune City on 24 February 2019, which ended in a 1–3 victory for Delhi. Chhangte ended his last campaign with Delhi Dynamos with five goals to his name.

==== Trials with Viking FK ====
While being at Delhi Dynamos, Chhangte went on for trials with Norwegian club, Viking FK for 10 days. After leaving Delhi Dynamos, he was called up for a second trial with the Norwegian club, after failing in his first stint. He later returned from Norway to India after his second stint failed to materialize into a permanent deal.

=== Chennaiyin ===
==== 2019–20 season ====
After Chhangte failed in his second extended trial with Viking FK, on 30 August 2019, it was announced that Chhangte had joined Chennaiyin FC from Delhi Dynamos on a two-year contract. Chhangte played his debut match for the club on 23 October 2019 in a 3–0 defeat against FC Goa.

He scored his debut goal for the club in the Southern Derby against Kerala Blasters FC on 20 December, which they won 3–1 after the final whistle. He scored his second of the season on 23 January 2020 in a 4–1 victory over Jamshedpur FC. He scored a brace in the second match of the season against the South Indian rivals, Kerala Blasters FC on 1 February, which they won with a score of 3–6 in one of the highest-scoring matches in the history of the Indian Super League.

Chhangte scored his next goal on 25 February against NorthEast United, where he scored the equaliser in the injury time, thereby taking the match to a 2–2 draw. Chennaiyin had a noteworthy campaign, as they went on to qualify for the knockout stages of the 2019–20 Indian Super League season.

Chennaiyin met Goa in the semi-finals. Chhangte played in the first leg of the semi-final match against FC Goa on 29 February, where he scored a goal, resulting in a 4–1 victory in the first leg. Chhangte scored again in the second leg on 7 March, which they lost 4–2, but qualified through to the final due to the aggregate score of 6–5.

He started in the final against ATK on 14 March, which they ended up losing 3–1. Chhangte had a standout season, as he scored seven goal throughout the campaign, thus becoming the second top Indian goalscorer of the season, behind Sunil Chhetri.

==== 2020–21 season ====
Chhangte played his first match of the 2020–21 Indian Super League on 24 November 2021 in a 1–2 victory over Jamshedpur FC. He scored his first goal of the season on 26 December 2020 against East Bengal, where he opened the scoresheet of match, which ended in a 2–2 draw.

Chhangte found the net again in the match against FC Goa on 13 February 2021, which ended in a 2–2 draw after a late goal by FC Goa. He scored a brace against NorthEast United on 18 February in the next matchday, which ended in a dramatic 3–3 draw. Chhangte thus ended his 2020–21 campaign with four goals in his name.

==== 2021–22 season ====
Chhangte's first match of the 2021–22 Indian Super League was away against Hyderabad FC on 23 November 2021, playing the full 90 minutes in a 1-0 win for the club. His first goal of the season came in the club's next match, away against his former club NorthEast United FC on 29 November 2021. This was the first goal of the match, as Chennaiyin went on to win the match 2-1.

On deadline day of the January transfer window, Chhangte left Chennaiyin to join fellow ISL club Mumbai City FC.

=== Mumbai City FC ===
==== 2021–22 season ====
Chhangte joined fellow ISL club Mumbai City FC on an initial six-month loan in the January 2022 transfer window, with a pre-contract agreed, which would be triggered at the end of the season. He later revealed that then-Mumbai head coach Des Buckingham had "promised that he will build me (Chhangte) into a different player and make him better, both as a footballer and a human."

In his initial loan spell, he played 7 league games but failed to score or assist. He featured in all 6 of Mumbai's AFC Champions League matches, as the club became the first and only Indian team to get a win in the AFC Champions League.

==== 2022–23 season ====
At the start of the 2022–23 transfer window, Chhangte's permanent transfer to the Mumbai City FC was officially confirmed. In his second season, and first full season, with The Islanders, Chhangte started the season brightly and scored his first ISL goal for Mumbai against Jamshedpur FC on 22 October 2022. This proved to be the catalyst for his season, as he went on to score 10 goals and provide 6 assists. Thanks to his, and the entire squad's contributions, Mumbai lifted the ISL league shield after a record-breaking 18-match unbeaten run, and a new ISL record of 11 consecutive wins.

He was the top scoring Indian in the 2022–23 season with his 10 goals, ahead of the second-highest scorer, club team-mate Bipin Singh, who was on 7 goals. This exceptional performance won him the Hero of the League award, becoming only the second-ever Indian recipient of the award after Sunil Chhetri, who won it in the 2017–18 season.

==== 2023–24 season ====
Chhangte began the 2023–24 season with a 0–2 loss versus Nassaji Mazandaran in the 2023–24 AFC Champions League. He scored his first goal from the penalty spot on 8 December 2023, the third goal in a 0–4 victory away versus Bengaluru. As he did in the 2022 AFC Champions League, Chhangte once again featured in every game Mumbai played in the 2023–24 AFC Champions League, but the campaign wasn't as fruitful for The Islanders, as they were knocked out in the group stage of the competition with zero points, and only one goal was scored throughout the six matches they played.

He scored his first ISL goal of the season in a 0-4 away win over Bengaluru FC, scoring Mumbai's fourth goal of the match through a penalty in the 61st minute. While Chhangte struggled to score goals early in the season, he hit goalscoring form in the latter part of the season, scoring six goals, alongside providing two assists, in Mumbai's last seven league games of the season.

He was crucial in Mumbai's push to retain their League Shield, but despite continuing his form to score away against Mohun Bagan SG in their final match, Mumbai still lost 2-1, allowing Mohun Bagan to lift the League Shield.

In the playoffs, Mumbai were 2-0 down away to FC Goa in the playoff semi-final first leg. However, Chhangte scored two goals from two Jayesh Rane assists to turn the game around. His first goal came in the 90th minute, rounding Goa goalkeeper Dheeraj Singh to slot home. Vikram Partap Singh scored the equalizer a minute later. In the sixth minute of injury time, Jayesh Rane stabbed the ball into Chhangte's path, who scored his second goal of the match, completing the comeback for Mumbai City FC. Chhangte scored in the second leg at home as well, scoring the second goal in a 2-0 win to take Mumbai to the ISL Final. In the final, they faced Mohun Bagan SG again, but this time Mumbai won the match 3-1, securing the club's second ISL Cup in their history.

==== 2024–25 season ====
On 28 June 2024, Chhangte signed a new three-year-contract with Mumbai, saying he had "no doubts" about extending his contract.

Ahead of the 2024–25 season, following the departure of previous club captain Rahul Bheke, Chhangte was made the new captain of the club. He made his first appearance of the season in the 2-2 draw against Mohun Bagan SG on 13 September 2024. He got his first win as Mumbai captain away against FC Goa on 19 October 2024, with the match ending 1-2 to Mumbai. He scored his first goal of the season at home against Kerala Blasters on 3 November 2024, scoring a late penalty into the bottom corner to secure a 4-2 win for The Islanders. In this match, Chhangte had also got the assist to Nikos Karelis for the first goal of the match with a low cross. This performance earned him the man of the match award, his first of the season.

Following a goalless spell, Chhangte got back on the scoresheet away against East Bengal FC on 6 January 2025. Playing centrally, he made a run from deep to score a composed finish into the bottom corner in the 39th minute. This was the first goal of the match, as Mumbai went on to win the match 2-3. This was also his first open play goal of the season. His performance won him the man of the match award, his second such award of the season. This goal also made him the first player to get 50 goal contributions for Mumbai City.

Chhangte scored his third goal of the season at home against Mohammedan SC on 26 January 2025. Chhangte got the ball on his left foot and took a shot, which took a deflection on its way into the goal. This was the second goal in an eventual 3-0 win for the club.

On 19 February 2025, Chhangte made his 100th appearance (in all competitions) for Mumbai City, in a 0-0 draw away to Hyderabad FC.

== International career ==
Chhangte represented India U19s for the 2016 AFC U-19 Championship qualification, appearing three times in a disappointing campaign. He was called up for the Indian senior squad to take part in the 2015 SAFF Championship. He made his debut for India on 25 December 2015 against Sri Lanka in the tournament, where he came on as a substitute for Robin Singh in 77th minute of the match. India went on to win the match 2–0. He became 502nd player to represent the India national team. On 27 December, Chhangte scored his debut goal for India, as he scored a brace in their 4–1 victory over Nepal in the same competition. By those goals, he became the then third youngest goalscorer for India's senior national team at the age of 18 years 140 days after Jerry Zirsanga at 16 years 311 days and Baichung Bhutia at the age of 18 years 90 days.

He represented India in the 2018 SAFF Championship, where he netted one goal after a 1−0 lead against Sri Lanka on 5 September 2018, helping India to win their first group match by 2−0. Chhangte was called up for the Indian squad to take part in the 2019 Intercontinental Cup. He scored a goal in India's second match against North Korea on 13 July 2019 while India was trailing by 0–3, which India lost 2−5 after the final whistle. After his impressive form in the ISL, he was included in the squad for the 2022 FIFA World Cup qualifiers.

== Personal life ==
Chhangte was born in Lunglei, Mizoram. His father was a teacher. He began to play football since grade one. His brother CVL Remtluanga is a footballer, who currently plays for the reserve side of Odisha FC. Chhangte has stated that his favourite footballers are former England international, Frank Lampard and current Portugal international, Cristiano Ronaldo.

Chhangte is sponsored by global sportswear brand Nike.

== Style of play ==
Chhangte's main role is as a winger. His pace has been noted, hitting a top speed of 35.80 km/h. As a result, he has been nicknamed 'Mizo Flash'. While primarily a winger, Chhangte is capable of playing across the front line. Apart from his pace, he uses positioning and dribbling ability to create chances.

== Career statistics ==
=== Club ===
As of match played 21 May 2026

Appearances and goals by club, season and competition
Club	Season	League			National cup (Note: Includes Federation Cup, Super Cup)		Continental		Other		Total	
Club	Season	Division	Apps	Goals	Apps	Goals	Apps	Goals	Apps	Goals	Apps	Goals
DSK Shivajians	2016–17	I-League	17	1	3	0	—		—		20	1
NorthEast United (loan)	2016	Indian Super League	1	0	0	0	—		—		1	0
Delhi Dynamos	2017–18	Indian Super League	18	3	1	0	—		—		19	3
Delhi Dynamos	2018–19	Indian Super League	18	5	1	0	—		—		19	5
Delhi Dynamos	Total		36	8	2	0	0	0	—		38	8
Chennaiyin	2019–20	Indian Super League	21	7	0	0	—		—		21	7
Chennaiyin	2020–21	Indian Super League	20	4	0	0	—		—		20	4
Chennaiyin	2021–22	Indian Super League	12	1	0	0	—		—		12	1
Chennaiyin	Total		53	12	0	0	0	0	—		53	12
Mumbai City (loan)	2021–22	Indian Super League	7	0	0	0	6 (Note: Appearances in AFC Champions League)	0	—		13	0
Mumbai City	2022–23	Indian Super League	22	10	3	1	0	0	8 (Note: Seven appearances and seven goals in Durand Cup, one appearance in play-offs for AFC Champions League)	7	33	18
Mumbai City	2023–24	Indian Super League	25	10	0	0	6	0	3 (Note: Appearances in Durand Cup)	1	34	11
Mumbai City	2024–25	Indian Super League	24	6	3	3	—		0	0	27	9
Mumbai City	2025–26	Indian Super League	13	4	4	0	—		0	0	17	4
Mumbai City	Total		84	30	10	4	6	0	11	8	111	42
Mohun Bagan	2026–27	Indian Super League	0	0	0	0	–		–		0	0
Career total			198	51	15	4	12	0	11	8	236	63

=== International ===
As of match played 9 June 2026

National team	Year	Apps	Goals
India	2015	3	2
India	2016	0	0
India	2017	0	0
India	2018	3	1
India	2019	6	1
India	2021	2	0
India	2022	2	0
India	2023	15	3
India	2024	10	1
India	2025	9	1
India	2026	5	0
Total		55	9

Scores and results list India's goal tally first, score column indicates score after each Chhangte goal.

List of international goals scored by Lallianzuala Chhangte
No.	Date	Venue	Cap	Opponent	Score	Result	Competition	Ref.
1	27 December 2015	Greenfield International Stadium, Thiruvananthapuram, India	2	Nepal	3–1	4–1	2015 SAFF Championship	
2	27 December 2015	Greenfield International Stadium, Thiruvananthapuram, India	2	Nepal	4–1	4–1	2015 SAFF Championship	
3	5 September 2018	Bangabandhu National Stadium, Dhaka, Bangladesh	5	Sri Lanka	2–0	2–0	2018 SAFF Championship	
4	13 July 2019	EKA Arena, Ahmedabad, India	10	North Korea	1–3	2–5	2019 Intercontinental Cup	
5	9 June 2023	Kalinga Stadium, Bhubaneshwar, India	20	Mongolia	2–0	2–0	2023 Intercontinental Cup	
6	18 June 2023	Kalinga Stadium, Bhubaneshwar, India	23	Lebanon	2–0	2–0	2023 Intercontinental Cup	
7	4 July 2023	Sree Kanteerava Stadium, Bengaluru, India	28	Kuwait	1–1	1–1	2023 SAFF Championship	
8	11 June 2024	Jassim Bin Hamad Stadium, Al Rayyan, Qatar	38	Qatar	1–0	1–2	2026 FIFA World Cup qualification	
9	14 October 2025	Jawaharlal Nehru Stadium, Margao, India	50	Singapore	1–0	1–2	2027 AFC Asian Cup qualification	

== Honours ==
Mohun Bagan

- Calcutta Football League: 2026
- IFA Shield: 2026

Chennaiyin

- Indian Super League runner-up: 2019–20

Mumbai City

- Indian Super League: 2022–23
- ISL Cup: 2023–24
- Durand Cup runner-up: 2022

India U23

- South Asian Games silver medal: 2016

India

- SAFF Championship: 2015, 2023; runner-up: 2018
- King's Cup third place: 2019
- Tri-Nation Series: 2023
- Intercontinental Cup: 2023

Individual

- AIFF Men's Player of the Year: 2022–23, 2023–24
- Indian Super League Hero of the League: 2022–23
- Durand Cup Golden Boot: 2022
- Indian Super League Hero of the Month: January 2023
- Hero Tri-Nation Series Player of the Tournament: 2023
- FPAI Indian Player of the Year: 2023
