= Narayan Das (footballer) =

Indian footballer (born 1993)

Personal information
- Date of birth: 25 September 1993 (age 33)
- Place of birth: Tribeni, West Bengal, India
- Height: 1.80 m (5 ft 11 in)
- Positions: Left-back; centre-back

Team information
- Current team: United Kolkata Sports Club

Youth career
- 2008–2012: Tata Football Academy

Senior career*
Years	Team	Apps	(Gls)
2012–2013	Pailan Arrows	22	(2)
2013–2015	Dempo	17	(0)
2014–2015	→ Goa (loan)	23	(0)
2015–2016	East Bengal	3	(0)
2016–2017	Pune City	13	(0)
2017	→ East Bengal (loan)	13	(0)
2017–2018	Goa	19	(0)
2018–2020	Odisha	35	(0)
2020–2021	East Bengal	17	(0)
2021–2023	Chennaiyin	25	(0)
2023–2024	Goa	4	(0)
2024–2025	Inter Kashi	21	(0)
2025	United Kolkata Sports Club	0	(0)
2026–	Sporting Clube De Goa	0	(0)

International career^{‡}
2011	India U19	3	(0)
2012–2016	India U23	8	(0)
2011–2019	India	29	(1)
- * Club domestic league appearances and goals as of 22:00, 6 April 2025 (UTC) ‡ National team caps and goals as of 28 December 2018

Narayan Das (Bengali: নারায়ণ দাস; born 25 September 1993) is an Indian professional footballer who plays as a defender for a Goa based club, Sporting Clube De Goa.

== Career ==
=== Early career ===
Born in Tribeni, West Bengal, Das graduated from the Tata Football Academy in 2012 and signed with Pailan Arrows, the All India Football Federation's development team in the I-League on 24 October 2012. He made his professional debut for the club four days later on 28 October 2012 against Salgaocar. He came on as a halftime substitute for Pritam Kotal and earned a yellow card in the 72nd minute as Pailan Arrows drew the match 0–0. Das scored the first goal of his career on 18 November 2012 against Prayag United. His 84th-minute goal managed to equalize the score at 1–1 but four minutes later Lalkamal Bhowmick found the winner for Prayag United and saw Pailan Arrows fall 2–1. The next match saw Das on the scoresheet again, this time against Sporting Goa. His 54th-minute strike was the only goal in a 1–0 victory for Pailan Arrows.

=== Dempo ===
After the 2012–13 season, Pailan Arrows disbanded and on 26 October 2013 it was announced that Das, along with Arrows teammates Alwyn George, Holicharan Narzary, and Pronay Halder, would sign with three-time I-League champions, Dempo. Dempo were also coached at the time by former Pailan Arrows head coach Arthur Papas. Das made his debut for the club on 1 November 2013 in the eighth round of the I-League against Mohun Bagan. Das started the match and played the whole ninety minutes as the match ended in a 0–0 draw.

After suffering from a knee injury during the 2014 Indian Super League with Goa, Das missed the entire 2014–15 I-League season as Dempo were relegated from the first division league.

==== Goa (loans) ====
On 23 July 2014, Das was part of the 2014 ISL Inaugural Domestic Draft in which he was selected by Goa, who were allowed to exclusively sign Dempo players. He made his debut for the team on 15 October 2014 against Chennaiyin. He started and played the full match as Goa lost 2–1. He continued to play as a regular for Goa as a left-back and formed a good partnership on the left side of the pitch with left winger Mandar Rao Desai. At the end of the season Das, along with teammates Rao Desai and Romeo Fernandes, were praised by Goa marquee player Robert Pires. The former France and Arsenal midfielder said that he was "really impressed with players like Romeo Fernandes, Mandar Rao Dessai, Narayan Das who have a great future". However, before the season ended, Das suffered a knee injury during Goa's semi-final match against Atlético de Kolkata. Goa head coach, Zico, blamed the artificial turf at the Salt Lake Stadium for Das's injury.

Despite missing the entire 2014–15 season due to injury, Das was retained by Goa for the 2015 season.

=== East Bengal ===
On 19 June 2015 it was revealed that Das, along with Dempo teammates Pronay Halder and Prabir Das, requested to be released by the Goan club in order to sign for other I-League clubs, after Dempo were relegated to the I-League 2. A few days later it was reported that the club had agreed to allow the players a release from their hefty contracts but that Dempo would also demand a transfer fee for the players. After the 2015 ISL season, it was announced that Das had signed with East Bengal on 13 January 2016. During the 2015–16 season with the club, coming back from injury, Das found himself as second choice left back behind club captain Robert Lalthlamuana.

=== Pune City ===
On 12 July 2016 it was announced that Das had signed with Pune City of the Indian Super League along with Augustin Fernandes. He made his debut for the club on 3 October 2015 against Mumbai City. He started the match and played the full 90 as Pune City lost 1–0.

=== Chennaiyin FC ===
On 29 June 2021, Narayan Das was signed by Chennaiyin FC on a two-year contract.

=== Sporting Clube De Goa ===
On 15 January 2026, Das joined Sporting Clube De Goa on a contact until the end of the season.

== International ==
Das was first called up to the India set up at the under-19 level during the 2012 AFC U-19 Championship qualifiers. He made his debut for the side on 1 November 2011 against Turkmenistan national under-19 football team. He started and played the full match as India won 3–1. Das was then called up to the under-23 side for the 2013 AFC U-22 Championship qualifiers. He made his debut for the side on 23 June 2012 against Lebanon. He started the match as India won 5–2.

On 19 November 2013 Das made his debut for the India senior side against Nepal. He started the match as India won 2–0. He scored his first goal for India on 3 September 2016 in a friendly against Puerto Rico. His 17th-minute goal was the equalizer for India who went on to win the match 4–1.

=== International goals ===
India score listed first, score column indicates score after each Das goal.

International goals by date, venue, cap, opponent, score, result and competition
No.	Date	Venue	Cap	Opponent	Score	Result	Competition
1	3 September 2016	Andheri Sports Complex, Mumbai, India	9	Puerto Rico	4–1	4–1	Friendly

== Career statistics ==
=== Club ===
As of 23 April 2025

Club	Season	League			Cup		AFC		Total	
Club	Season	Division	Apps	Goals	Apps	Goals	Apps	Goals	Apps	Goals
Pailan Arrows	2012–13	I-League	22	2	0	0	—		22	2
Dempo	2013–14	I-League	17	0	4 (Note: Appearance(s) in Federation Cup)	0	—		21	0
Goa (loan)	2014	Indian Super League	14	0	0	0	—		14	0
Goa (loan)	2015	Indian Super League	9	0	0	0	—		9	0
Goa (loan)	Total		23	0	0	0	0	0	23	0
East Bengal	2015–16	I-League	3	0	2	0	—		5	0
Pune City	2016	Indian Super League	13	0	0	0	—		13	0
East Bengal (loan)	2016–17	I-League	13	0	4	0	—		17	0
Goa	2017–18	Indian Super League	19	0	3 (Note: Appearance(s) in Super Cup)	0	—		22	0
Odisha	2018–19	Indian Super League	17	0	3	0	—		20	0
Odisha	2019–20	Indian Super League	18	0	0	0	—		18	0
East Bengal	2020–21	Indian Super League	17	0	0	0	—		17	0
Chennaiyin	2021–22	Indian Super League	19	0	0	0	—		19	0
Chennaiyin	2022–23	Indian Super League	6	0	8 (Note: Appearance(s) in Durand Cup)	0	—		14	0
Chennaiyin	Total		25	0	8	0	0	0	33	0
Goa	2023–24	Indian Super League	4	0	3	0	—		7	0
Inter Kashi	2024–25	I-League	21	0	1	0	—		22	0
Career total			212	2	28	0	0	0	240	2

== Honours ==
India

- SAFF Championship: 2015
- Tri-Nation Series: 2017
- Intercontinental Cup: 2018

India U23

- South Asian Games Silver medal: 2016
