= Eli Sabiá =

Brazilian footballer (born 1988)

Personal information
- Full name: Eli Sabiá Filho
- Date of birth: 31 August 1988 (age 38)
- Place of birth: Mogi Guaçu, Brazil
- Height: 1.89 m (6 ft 2 in)
- Position: Centre-back

Team information
- Current team: Sreenidi Deccan
- Number: 22

Youth career
- 2006: Paulista

Senior career*
Years	Team	Apps	(Gls)
2006–2011	Paulista	48	(2)
2007–2008	→ Lausanne (loan)	47	(1)
2008–2009	→ Santos (loan)	22	(1)
2010	→ Atlético Paranaense (loan)	2	(0)
2011–2015	São Caetano	85	(0)
2013	→ Brasiliense (loan)	17	(0)
2014	→ Criciúma (loan)	0	(0)
2015	→ Botafogo-SP (loan)	15	(1)
2016	Água Santa	7	(0)
2016	Sampaio Corrêa	4	(0)
2016–2017	Chennaiyin	11	(0)
2017	Sertãozinho	16	(0)
2017–2018	Al-Raed	21	(1)
2018–2021	Chennaiyin	56	(2)
2021–2023	Jamshedpur	33	(1)
2023–2025	Sreenidi Deccan	33	(3)
- * Club domestic league appearances and goals as of 10:32, 24 January 2025 (UTC)

Eli Sabiá Filho (born 31 August 1988) is a Brazilian professional footballer who plays as a centre-back for Campeonato Paulista Série A3 club União São João.

== Career ==
Eli Sabiá began his career with Paulista and joined in July 2007 to Lausanne on loan; he rejoined Paulista on 29 January 2009.

On 14 May 2009 Santos signed Sabiá on loan from Paulista.

Sabiá profoundly played for Indian Super League side Chennaiyin whereby he had two time contract with the side. He was appointed as the vice-captain of the team for 2020–21 season and became captain in January 2021 after appointed captain Rafael Crivellaro ruled out of the season with ankle injury.

In July 2021, Eli Sabiá signed with another Indian Super League side Jamshedpur. The club announced his signing on 31 August 2021.

== Honours ==
Jamshedpur

- Indian Super League Premiership: 2021–22
