= Chennaiyin FC Reserves and Academy =

Football youth system in India

- Full name: Chennaiyin Football Club Reserves and Academy
- Founded: Reserves: 12 January 2018; 8 years ago Academy: 28 August 2017; 9 years ago
- Ground: Various
- Owner: Abhishek Bachchan; MS Dhoni; Vita Dani
- League: I-League 2nd Division (formerly); Youth League U18
- Website: chennaiyinfc.com
| Home colours | Away colours |

Departments of Chennayin FC
| Football (Men's) | Football (Reserves & Academy) | eSports |

Chennaiyin Football Club Reserves and Academy, also known as Chennaiyin FC B, is the youth system of the Indian Super League side Chennaiyin. Based in Chennai, Tamil Nadu, the reserve side was founded on 12 January 2018 and participated in the I-League 2nd Division, the second division of Indian football. Club's academ was founded on 28 August 2017. Under 18 side participates in Youth League U18, the highest level for youth football in India. They also sometimes join the Chennai Football League. The reserve side was most notably coached by Cleofas Alex,

== Reserves ==
=== History ===
On 12 January 2018, it was announced by Chennaiyin, a club that competes in the Indian Super League, that they would form a "B" team that would serve as their reserve team. They first participated in I-League 2nd Division. Syed Sabir Pasha, the club's technical director for youth development, was also announced as the team's first head coach while the club also announced the first seven signings from the AIFF Elite Academy.

The team played their first match on 13 January 2018 in the Don Bosco - Fr. McFerran Trophy All India Football Tournament against ICF. Bedashwor Singh scored the first goal for Chennaiyin FC B as they won 1–0.

== Academy ==
=== History ===
On 28 August 2017, on Chennaiyin's third year of existence, the club announced the formation of three age group teams that would participate in the All India Football Federation operated youth leagues at the under-18, under-15, and under-13 levels. During the launch of the teams, Syed Sabir Pasha, the club's youth technical director said that the under-15 and under-13 teams would consist of players only from Tamil Nadu while players from other regions could make the under-18 side.

== Honours ==
=== Cup ===
- Stafford Challenge Cup
  - Runners-up (1): 2023
