= List of Chennaiyin FC players =

Chennaiyin Football Club is a professional association football club based in Chennai, India, that plays in Indian Super League. The club was formed in 2014 and played its first competitive match on 15 October 2014 and defeated FC Goa by 2–1 due well anticipated the goals of Balwant Singh and Elano. The club won two ISL titles, and appeared as the runner-ups of the Super Cup. The club was the first ISL to appear in AFC Cup and went up to Group stage in 2019 edition whereby they made second rank on the table. They failed to make into knockouts .

== List of players ==
- Appearances and goals are for Indian Super League and Super Cup matches only.
- Players are listed according to the date of their first team debut for the club. Only players with at least one appearance are included.

Statistics correct as of 28 August 2020

Table headers

- Nationality – If a player played international football, the country/countries he played for are shown. Otherwise, the player's nationality is given as their country of birth.
- Career span – The year of the player's first appearance for Chennaiyin FC to the year of his last appearance.
- Matches – The total number of games played, both as a starter and as a substitute

The list includes all the players registered under a Chennaiyin FC contract. Some players might not have featured in a professional game for the club.

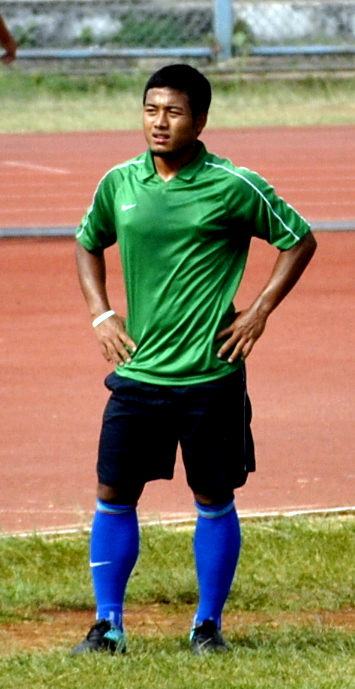
Jeje Lalpekhlua has the most caps (77) for the club. He is the leading goal scorer having scored 25 goals.

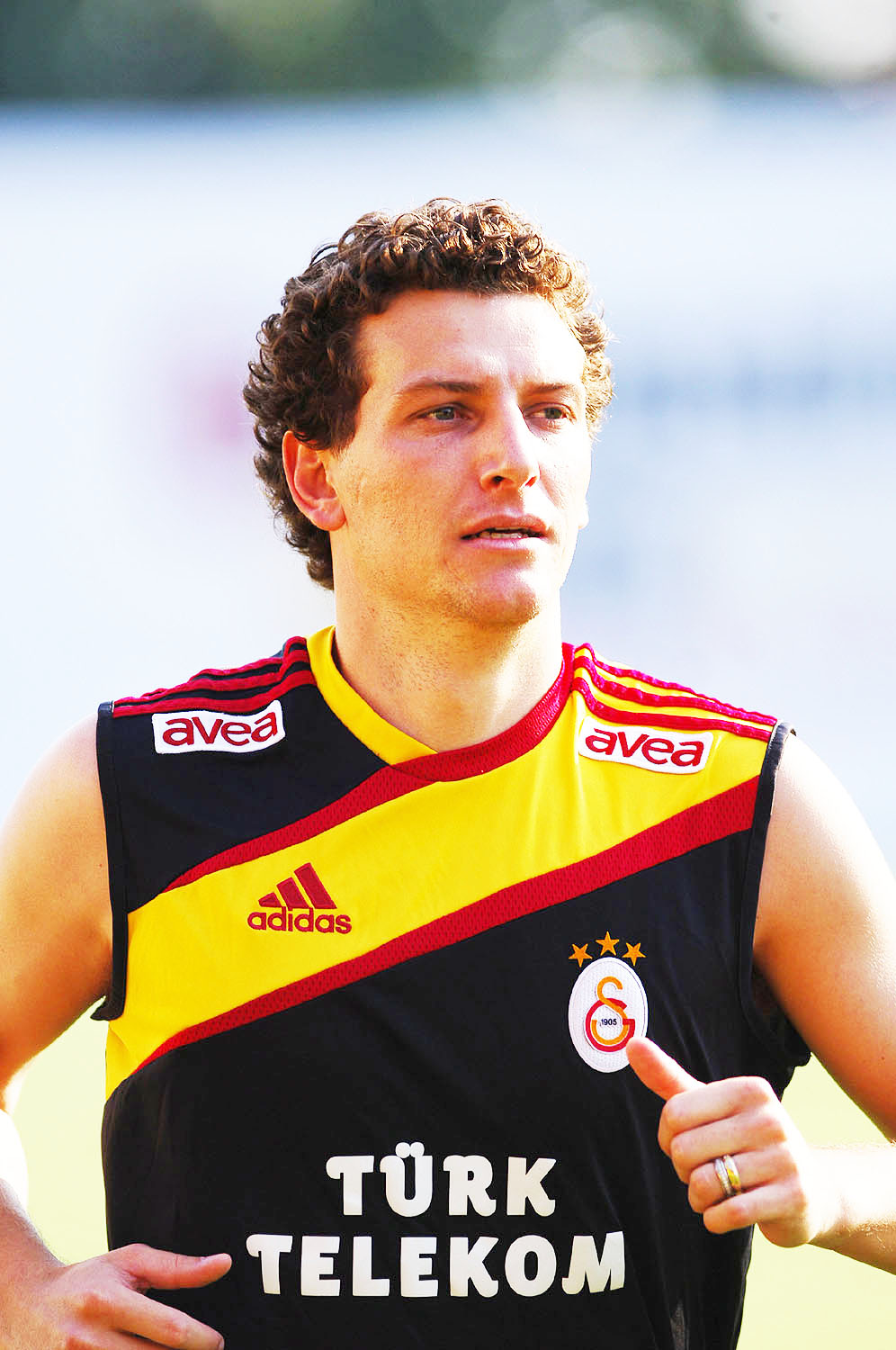
Elano is the first Golden Boot winner of the league and club as well. He won it in 2014.

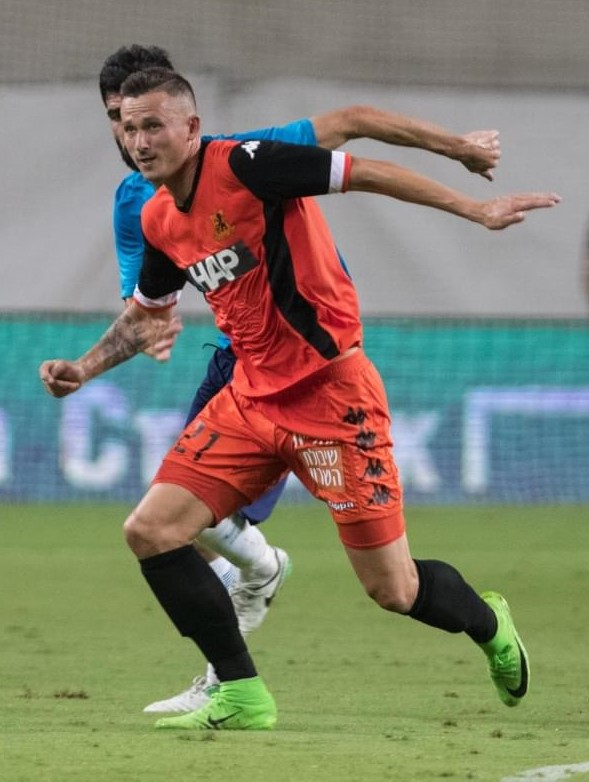
Nerijus Valskis is the sixth Golden Boot winner of the league and third of club as well. He won it in 2020–21.

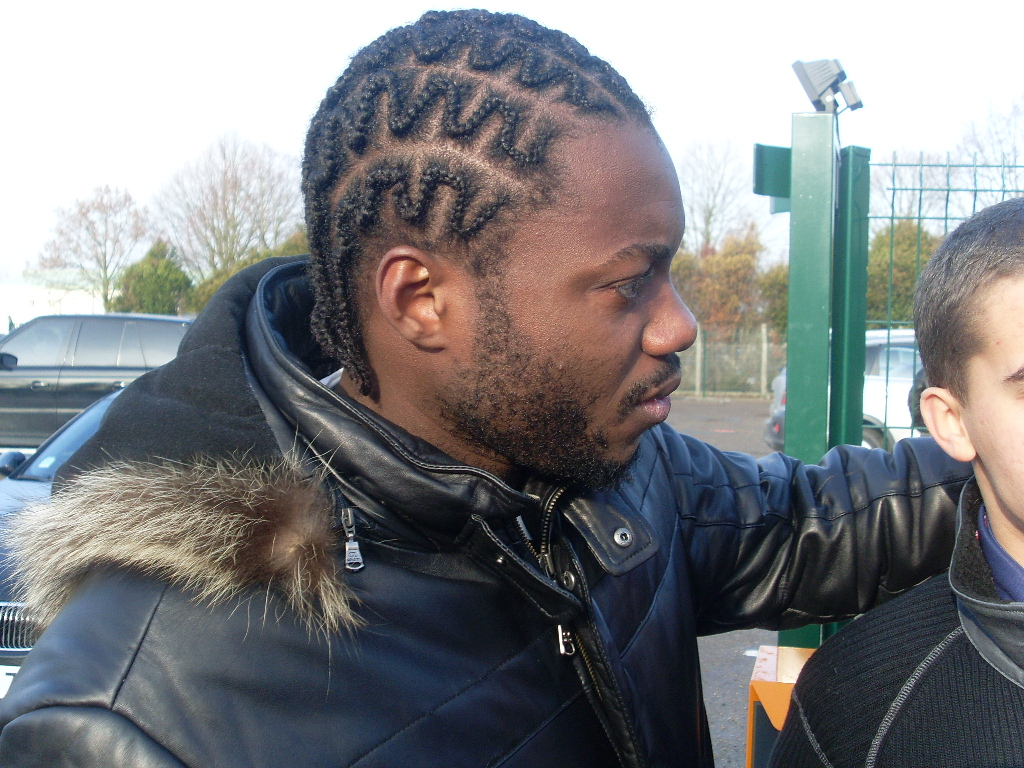
Apoula Edel is the second Golden Glove winner of the league and first of club as well. He won it in 2015.

Name	Nat	Pos^{[NB]}	Chennaiyin FC career	Apps	Goals	Ref
Gennaro Bracigliano	(France)	Goalkeeper	2014–2015	13	0	
Elano	(Brazil)	Midfielder	2014–2015	26	12	
Alessandro Nesta	(Italy)	Defender	2014	3	0	
Bojan Djordjic	(Sweden)	Midfielder	2014	11	0	
Bernard Mendy	(France)	Defender	2014–2016	39	5	
Eric Djemba-Djemba	(Cameroon)	Midfielder	2014	9	0	
Stiven Mendoza	(Colombia)	Forward	2014–2015	25	17	
Jairo Suárez	(Colombia)	Defender	2014	7	0	
Jean-Eudes Maurice	(Haiti)	Forward	2014	8	1	
Marco Materazzi	(Italy)	Defender	2014	7	0	
Mikaël Silvestre	(France)	Defender	2014	14	1	
Abhijit Mondal	(India)	Goalkeeper	2014	0	0	
Cristian Hidalgo	(Spain)	Midfielder	2014	7	1	
Bruno Pelissari	(Brazil)	Midfielder	2014–2015	25	7	
Francesco Franzese	(Italy)	Goalkeeper	2014	0	0	
Shilton Paul	(India)	Goalkeeper	2014	4	0	
Jeje Lalpekhlua	(India)	Forward	2014–2020	77	25	
Dhanachandra Singh	(India)	Defender	2014–2018	28	3	
Sukhwinder Singh	(India)	Midfielder	2014	0	0	
Khelemba Singh	(India)	Defender	2014–2015	0	0	
Dane Pereira	(India)	Defender	2014–2015	2	0	
Eduardo Silva Lerma	(Spain)	Midfielder	2014	0	0	
Pierre Jonas Folke Tillman	(Sweden)	Midfielder	2014	0	0	
Denson Devadas	(India)	Midfielder	2014	15	0	
Abhishek Das	(India)	Defender	2014–2015	8	0	
Jayesh Rane	(India)	Forward	2014–2017	20	1	
Balwant Singh	(India)	Forward	2014–2016	20	1	
Harmanjot Khabra	(India)	Midfielder	2014–2017	34	0	
Gouramangi Singh	(India)	Defender	2014–2015	11	0	
Jaison Vales	(India)	Forward	2014	0	0	
Anthony Barbosa	(India)	Midfielder	2014	0	0	
Pappachen Pradeep	(India)	Midfielder	2014	1	0	
Mohammed Ismail	(India)	Defender	2014–2015	0	0	
Karanjit Singh	(India)	Goalkeeper	2015–present	63	0	
Éder	(Brazil)	Defender	2015–2016	5	0	
Dhanpal Ganesh	(India)	Midfielder	2015–present	33	2	
Justin Stephen	(India)	Defender	2015	0	0	
Manuele Blasi	(Italy)	Midfielder	2015–2016	19	0	
Godwin Franco	(India)	Midfielder	2015	6	0	
Fikru	(Ethiopia)	Forward	2015	11	1	
Nidhin Lal	(India)	Goalkeeper	2015	0	0	
Raphael Augusto	(Brazil)	Midfielder	2015–2019	69	7	
Sena Ralte	(India)	Defender	2015	6	0	
Zakeer Mundampara	(India)	Midfielder	2015–2017	10	0	
Apoula Edel	(Armenia)	Goalkeeper	2015	13	0	
Mehrajuddin Wadoo	(India)	Defender	2015–2016	27	1	
Maílson Alves	(Brazil)	Defender	2015–2019	57	8	
Alessandro Potenza	(Italy)	Defender	2015	10	0	
Pawan Kumar	(India)	Goalkeeper	2015–2018	1	0	
Gilbert Oliveira	(India)	Midfielder	2015	0	0	
Nallappan Mohanraj	(India)	Defender	2016	2	0	
Hans Mulder	(Netherlands)	Midfielder	2016	12	2	
John Arne Riise	(Norway)	Defender	2016	10	1	
Davide Succi	(Italy)	Forward	2016	13	3	
Thoi Singh	(India)	Forward	2016–present	72	4	
Eli Sabiá	(Brazil)	Defender	2016, 2018–present	60	3	
Daniel Lalhlimpuia	(India)	Forward	2016	3	0	
Siam Hanghal	(India)	Midfielder	2016	10	0	
Maurizio Peluso	(Italy)	Forward	2016	3	0	
Uttam Rai	(India)	Forward	2016	1	0	
Duwayne Kerr	(Jamaica)	Goalkeeper	2016	5	0	
Baljit Sahni	(India)	Forward	2016	8	0	
Jerry Lalrinzuala	(India)	Defender	2016–present	76	1	
Dudu Omagbemi	(Nigeria)	Forward	2016	13	5	
Henrique Sereno	(Portugal)	Defender	2017–2018	14	1	
Bikramjit Singh	(India)	Midfielder	2017–2018	16	0	
Gregory Nelson	(Netherlands)	Forward	2017–2019	33	3	
Jaime Gavilán	(Spain)	Midfielder	2017–2018	11	0	
Jude Nworuh	(Nigeria)	Forward	2017–2018	9	0	
Rene Mihelič	(Slovenia)	Midfielder	2017–2018	14	2	
Iñigo Calderón	(Spain)	Defender	2017–2019	32	4	
Anirudh Thapa	(India)	Midfielder	2016–present	69	5	
Mohammed Rafi	(India)	Forward	2017–2019	21	5	
Baoringdao Bodo	(India)	Forward	2017–2019	2	0	
Germanpreet Singh	(India)	Midfielder	2017–present	36	0	
Fulganco Cardozo	(India)	Midfielder	2017–2018	1	0	
Francis Fernandes	(India)	Midfielder	2017–2019	37	1	
Keenan Almeida	(India)	Defender	2017–2019	5	0	
Shahinlal Meloly	(India)	Defender	2017–2019	5	0	
Sanjay Balmuchu	(India)	Defender	2017–2018	1	0	
Aimol Reamsochung	(India)	Defender	2018–present	2	0	
Bibin Boban	(India)	Midfielder	2018–present	0	0	
Prosenjit Chakraborty	(India)	Defender	2018–2019	0	0	
Bedashwor Singh	(India)	Midfielder	2018–2019	1	0	
Saurabh Meher	(India)	Midfielder	2018–2019	0	0	
Laldinliana Renthlei	(India)	Defender	2018–2020	34	0	
Aman Chetri	(India)	Forward	2018–2019	0	0	
Tondonba Singh	(India)	Defender	2018–2020	26	0	
Carlos Salom	(Palestine)	Forward	2018–2019	11	1	
Andrea Orlandi	(Spain)	Forward	2018–2019	9	0	
Sinivasan Pandiyan	(India)	Midfielder	2018–present	0	0	
Halicharan Narzary	(India)	Forward	2019	3	0	
C. K. Vineeth	(India)	Midfielder	2019	18	4	
Isaac Vanmalsawma	(India)	Defender	2018–2019	20	2	
Zohmingliana Ralte	(India)	Midfielder	2018–2019	4	0	
Sanjiban Ghosh	(India)	Goalkeeper	2018–present	3	0	
Zonunmawia	(India)	Midfielder	2018–present	0	0	
Hendry Antonay	(India)	Defender	2018–present	0	0	
Nikhil Bernard	(India)	Goalkeeper	2018–2019	0	0	
Nerijus Valskis	(Lithuania)	Forward	2019–2020	20	15	
Chris Herd	(Australia)	Forward	2019	5	0	
Rafael Crivellaro	(Brazil)	Midfielder	2019–present	20	7	
Lucian Goian	(Romania)	Defender	2019–2020	20	2	
André Schembri	(Malta)	Forward	2019–2020	18	5	
Dragoș Firțulescu	(Romania)	Midfielder	2019–2020	16	0	
Edwin Sydney Vanspaul	(India)	Defender	2019–present	18	0	
Masih Saighani	(Afghanistan)	Midfielder	2019–2020	12	1	
Lallianzuala Chhangte	(India)	Midfielder	2019–present	21	7	
Vishal Kaith	(India)	Goalkeeper	2019–present	20	0	
Deepak Tangri	(India)	Defender	2018–present	5	0	
Bawlte Rohmingthanga	(India)	Forward	2019	0	0	
Rahim Ali	(India)	Forward	2019–present	6	0	
Enes Sipović	(Bosnia and Herzegovina)	Defender	2020–present	0	0	
Memo	(Brazil)	Midfielder	2020–present	0	0	
Reagan Singh	(India)	Defender	2020–present	0	0	
Lalchhuanmawia	(India)	Defender	2020–	0	0	
Aman Chetri	(India)	Forward	2020–	0	0	
Isma	(Guinea-Bissau)	Forward	2020–	0	0	

== List of marquee players ==
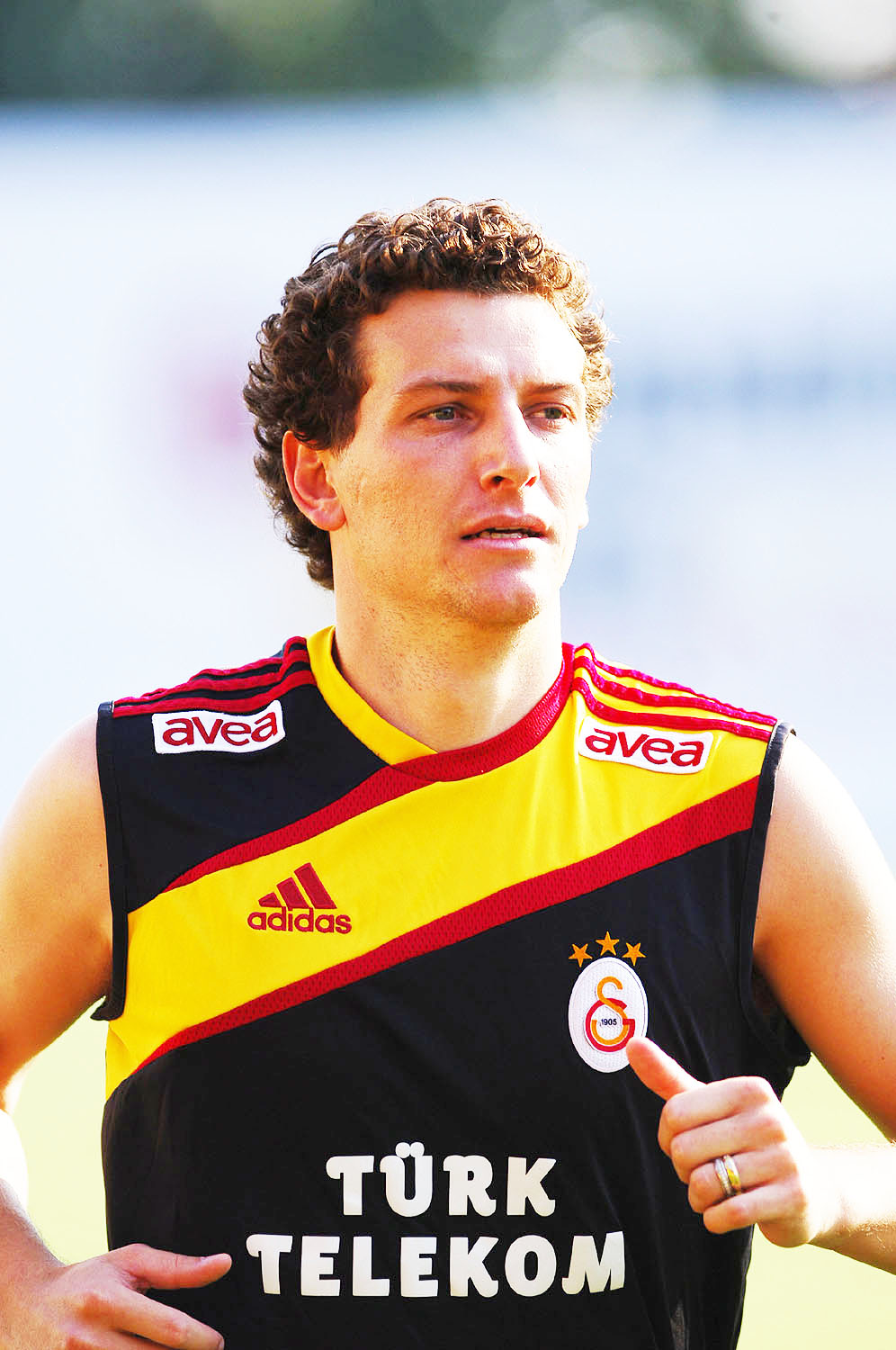
Elano was the marquee for two seasons namely 2014 and 2015.

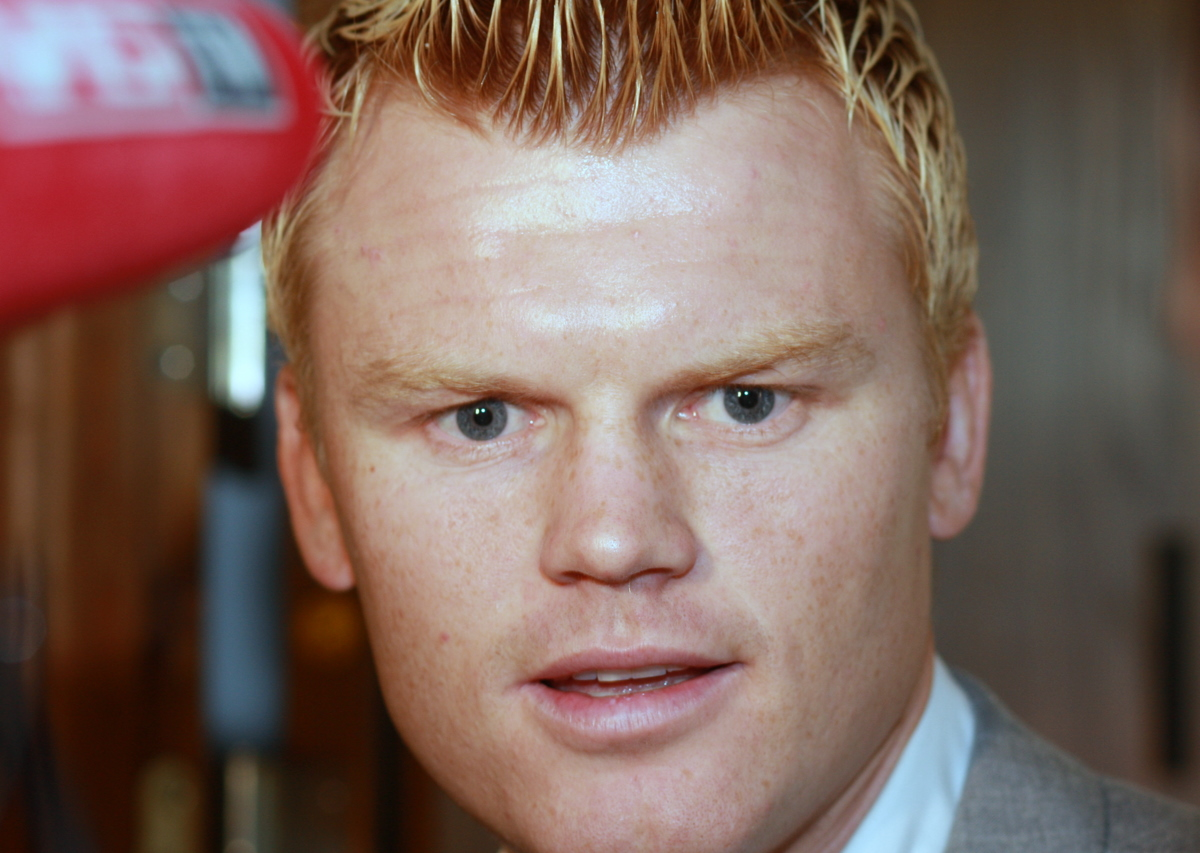
Riise was the marquee for third seasons namely 2016.

Year signed	Marquee	ref
2014–2015	(Brazil) Elano	
2016	(Norway) John Arne Riise	

== By nationality ==
As of 25 October 2020.

=== All Players ===
Country	Number of players
India	70
Brazil	8
Italy	7
Spain	5
France	3
Colombia	2
Netherlands	2
Nigeria	2
Romania	2
Sweden	2
Afghanistan	1
Armenia	1
Australia	1
Bosnia	1
Cameroon	1
Ethiopia	1
Guinea Bissau	1
Haiti	1
Jamaica	1
Lithuania	1
Malta	1
Norway	1
Portugal	1
Slovenia	1
Palestine	1
TOTAL	118
