= 2017–18 Chennaiyin FC season =

2017–18 season of Chennaiyin FC

Chennaiyin
2017-2018 season
- Head Coach: John Gregory
- Stadium: Jawaharlal Nehru Stadium, Chennai
- ISL: 2nd
- ISL finals: Winners
- Top goalscorer: League: (India) Jeje Lalpekhlua (9 goals); All: (India) Jeje Lalpekhlua (9 goals)
- Highest home attendance: 19,013
- Lowest home attendance: 12,499
- Average home league attendance: 15,538
- Biggest win: 3–0 (vs NorthEast United on 23 Nov 2017); 3–0 (vs Goa on 13 Mar 2018)
- Biggest defeat: 1–3 (vs NorthEast United on 19 January 2018); 1–3 (vs Bengaluru on 6 February 2018)
Home colours	Away colours
- All statistics correct as of 13 March 2018.

The 2017–18 Chennaiyin FC season was the club's fourth season since its establishment in 2014 and their fourth season in the Indian Super League.

== Transfers ==
=== Pre-season ===
In: Note: Flags indicate national team as defined under FIFA eligibility rules; some limited exceptions apply. Players may hold more than one non-FIFA nationality.

No.	Pos.	Nation	Player
2	DF	POR	Sereno (from (Spain) Almería)
6	MF	IND	Bikramjit Singh (from (India) Mohun Bagan)
7	FW	NED	Gregory Nelson (from (Bahrain) Al-Muharraq)
8	MF	ESP	Jaime Gavilán (from (South Korea) Suwon)
9	FW	NGR	Jude Nworuh (from (Finland) Ilves)
10	MF	SLO	Rene Mihelič (from (Latvia) Riga)
11	MF	IND	Thoi Singh (loan return from (India) Mumbai)
12	FW	IND	Jeje Lalpekhlua (loan return from (India) Mohun Bagan)
14	DF	ESP	Iñigo Calderón (from (Cyprus) Anorthosis Famagusta)
17	FW	IND	Dhanpal Ganesh (loan return from (India) Chennai City)
18	DF	IND	Jerry Lalrinzuala (loan return from (India) DSK Shivajians)
19	MF	BRA	Raphael Augusto (loan return from (Brazil) Bangu)
20	FW	IND	Mohammed Rafi (from (India) Kerala Blasters)
27	DF	BRA	Maílson Alves (from (Brazil) Voltaço)
28	MF	IND	Germanpreet Singh (from (India) Minerva Punjab)
29	DF	IND	Fulganco Cardozo (from (India) Churchill Brothers)
30	MF	IND	Francis Fernandes (from (India) Pune City)
32	DF	IND	Keenan Almeida (from (India) Goa)
33	DF	IND	Sanjay Balmuchu (from (India) Goa)
36	GK	IND	Shahinlal Meloly (from (India) Chennai City)

Out: Note: Flags indicate national team as defined under FIFA eligibility rules; some limited exceptions apply. Players may hold more than one non-FIFA nationality.

No.	Pos.	Nation	Player
2	DF	BRA	Éder
3	DF	IND	Nallappan Mohanraj (to (India) ATK)
4	MF	NED	Hans Mulder (to (Spain) Eldense)
5	DF	FRA	Bernard Mendy
6	DF	NOR	John Arne Riise
7	MF	IND	Harmanjot Khabra (to (India) Bengaluru)
8	MF	ITA	Manuele Blasi
9	FW	ITA	Davide Succi (to (Italy) Forlì)
10	FW	IND	Jayesh Rane (to (India) ATK)
11	MF	IND	Thoi Singh (loan to (India) Mumbai)
12	FW	IND	Jeje Lalpekhlua (loan to (India) Mohun Bagan)
13	DF	BRA	Eli Sabiá (to (Saudi Arabia) Al-Raed)
15	DF	IND	Abhishek Das (to (India) Mohun Bagan)
16	FW	IND	Daniel Lalhlimpuia (loan return to (India) Bengaluru)
17	FW	IND	Dhanpal Ganesh (loan to (India) Chennai City)
18	MF	IND	Siam Hanghal (to (India) Kerala Blasters, previously on loan to (India) Mumbai)
19	MF	BRA	Raphael Augusto (loan to (Brazil) Bangu)
20	FW	ITA	Maurizio Peluso (to (Italy) L'Aquila)
21	FW	IND	Uttam Rai (to (India) Mohun Bagan, previously on loan to (India) Minerva Punjab)
22	MF	IND	Zakeer Mundampara (to (India) Mumbai City, previously on loan to (India) Chennai City)
26	DF	IND	Mehrajuddin Wadoo (to (India) Sporting Goa)
27	GK	JAM	Duwayne Kerr
33	FW	IND	Baljit Sahni (to (India) Mumbai)
43	DF	IND	Jerry Lalrinzuala (loan to (India) DSK Shivajians)
99	FW	NGR	Dudu

== Squad ==
As of 15 September 2017

Note: Flags indicate national team as defined under FIFA eligibility rules; some limited exceptions apply. Players may hold more than one non-FIFA nationality.

No.	Pos.	Nation	Player
1	GK	IND	Karanjit Singh
2	DF	POR	Henrique Sereno (Captain)
6	MF	IND	Bikramjit Singh
7	FW	NED	Gregory Nelson
8	MF	ESP	Jaime Gavilán (3rd captain)
9	FW	NGR	Jude Nworuh
10	MF	SLO	Rene Mihelič
11	MF	IND	Thoi Singh
12	FW	IND	Jeje Lalpekhlua
13	GK	IND	Pawan Kumar
14	DF	ESP	Iñigo Calderón (Vice Captain)
15	MF	IND	Anirudh Thapa
17	MF	IND	Dhanpal Ganesh

No.	Pos.	Nation	Player
18	DF	IND	Jerry Lalrinzuala
19	MF	BRA	Raphael Augusto
20	FW	IND	Mohammed Rafi
21	FW	IND	Baoringdao Bodo
25	DF	IND	Dhanachandra Singh
27	DF	BRA	Maílson Alves
28	MF	IND	Germanpreet Singh
29	DF	IND	Fulganco Cardozo
30	MF	IND	Francis Fernandes
32	DF	IND	Keenan Almeida
33	DF	IND	Sanjay Balmuchu
36	GK	IND	Shahinlal Meloly

=== Technical staff ===
Position	Name
Head coach	(England) John Gregory
Assistant coach	(England) Mark Lillis
Assistant coach	(India) Syed Sabir Pasha
Sports scientist	(England) Niall Clark
Goalkeeping coach	(England) Tony Warner
Physiotherapist	Robert Gilbert

== Competitions ==
=== Indian Super League ===
==== League table ====
Pos	Team	Pld	W	D	L	GF	GA	GD	Pts	Qualification or relegation
1	Bengaluru	18	13	1	4	35	16	+19	40	Qualification for ISL play-offs
2	Chennaiyin (Note: Qualified for 2019 AFC Cup qualifying play-offs) (C)	18	9	5	4	24	19	+5	32	Qualification for ISL play-offs
3	Goa	18	9	3	6	42	28	+14	30	Qualification for ISL play-offs
4	Pune City	18	9	3	6	30	21	+9	30	Qualification for ISL play-offs
5	Jamshedpur	18	7	5	6	16	18	−2	26	

Source: Indian Super League
Rules for classification: 1) points; 2) head-to-head points; 3) head-to-head goal difference; 4) head-to-head goals scored; 5) goal difference; 5) number of goals scored; 6) fair play ranking; 6) drawing of lots
(C) Champions

==== Results summary ====
Overall								Home						Away					
Pld	W	D	L	GF	GA	GD	Pts	W	D	L	GF	GA	GD	W	D	L	GF	GA	GD
18	9	5	4	24	19	+5	32	4	3	2	15	12	+3	5	2	2	9	7	+2

Last updated: 3 March 2018.
Source: Matches

==== Results by round ====
Round	1	2	3	4	5	6	7	8	9	10	11	12	13	14	15	16	17	18
Ground	H	H	A	H	A	A	H	A	H	H	A	A	H	A	A	H	A	H
Result	L	W	W	W	L	W	D	W	D	W	L	W	L	D	W	D	D	W
Position	9	3	2	3	3	2	1	1	2	1	2	2	2	4	3	3	3	2

Updated to match(es) played on 3 March 2018. Source: Matches
A = Away; H = Home; W = Win; D = Draw; L = Loss

==== Matches ====
Win Draw Loss

===== League stage =====
19 November 2017 1	Chennaiyin FC	2–3	Goa	Chennai, India
17:30 IST (UTC+5:30)	Karanjit Singh (yellow card) 41'; Bikramjit Singh (yellow card) 55'; Iñigo Calderón 70'; Raphael Augusto (yellow card) 80' (goal) 84' (pen.)	Report	Ferran Corominas 25'; Manuel Lanzarote 29'; Mandar Rao Dessai 38'; Brandon Fernandes (yellow card) 60'	Stadium: Jawaharlal Nehru Stadium; Attendance: 18213; MVP: Manuel Lanzarote (FC Goa)

23 November 2017 2	Chennaiyin FC	3–0	NorthEast United	Chennai, India
20:00 IST (UTC+5:30)	Hakku Nediyodath 11' (o.g.); Raphael Augusto 24'; Dhanpal Ganesh (yellow card) 55'; Maílson Alves (yellow card) 81'; Mohammed Rafi 84'	Report	Marcinho (yellow card) 57'; Danilo (yellow card) 87'	Stadium: Jawaharlal Nehru Stadium; Attendance: 16795; Referee: Santhosh Kumar; MVP: Raphael Augusto (Chennaiyin FC)

3 December 2017 3	Pune City	0–1	Chennaiyin FC	Pune, India
17:30 IST (UTC+5:30)	Adil Khan (yellow card) 54'	Report	Iñigo Calderón (yellow card) 18'; Henrique Sereno (yellow card) 50' (goal) 82'; Dhanpal Ganesh (yellow card) 60'; Anirudh Thapa (yellow card) 78'	Stadium: Shree Shiv Chhatrapati Sports Complex; Attendance: 9881; Referee: Ajit Meetei; MVP: Jerry Lalrinzuala (Chennaiyin FC)

7 December 2017 4	Chennaiyin FC	3–2	ATK	Chennai, India
20:00 IST (UTC+5:30)	Henrique Sereno (yellow card) 41'; Jeje Lalpekhlua 65', 90'; Gregory Nelson (yellow card) 74'; Iñigo Calderón 84'; Dhanpal Ganesh (yellow card) 90'	Report	Zequinha 77'; Njazi Kuqi 89'	Stadium: Jawaharlal Nehru Stadium (Chennai); Attendance: 17192; Referee: Santhosh Kumar; MVP: Jeje Lalpekhlua (Chennaiyin FC)

10 December 2017 5	Mumbai City	1–0	Chennaiyin FC	Mumbai, India
20:00 IST (UTC+5:30)	Davinder Singh (yellow card) 6'; Lucian Goian (yellow card) 19'; Abhinas Ruidas (yellow card) 53'; Achille Emana 60'; Sehnaj Singh (yellow card) 70'	Report	Iñigo Calderón (yellow card) 35'; Maílson Alves (yellow card) 59'	Stadium: Mumbai Football Arena; Attendance: 7112; Referee: Ranjit Bhakshi; MVP: Achille Emana (Mumbai City FC)

17 December 2017 6	Bengaluru	1–2	Chennaiyin FC	Bengaluru, India
17:30 IST (UTC+5:30)	Harmanjot Khabra (yellow card) 13'; Sunil Chhetri 85'	Report	Jeje Lalpekhlua 5'; Mailson Alves (yellow card) 64'; Jerry Lalrinzuala (yellow card) 67'; Dhanpal Ganesh (yellow card) 82' (goal) 88'	Stadium: Sree Kanteerava Stadium; Attendance: 21924; Referee: Raktim Shah; MVP: Mailson Alves (Chennaiyin FC)

22 December 2017 7	Chennaiyin FC	1–1	Kerala Blasters	Chennai, India
20:00 IST (UTC+5:30)	Raphael Augusto (yellow card) 53'; Henrique Sereno (yellow card) 83'; Rene Mihelic 89'	Report	Siam Hanghal (yellow card) 68'; Sandesh Jhingan (yellow card) 88'; C.K. Vineeth 90'	Stadium: Jawaharlal Nehru Stadium (Chennai); Attendance: 16754; Referee: Pranjal Banerji; MVP: Karanjit Singh (Chennaiyin FC)

28 December 2017 8	Jamshedpur	0–1	Chennaiyin FC	Jamshedpur, India
20:00 IST (UTC+5:30)	Mehtab Hossain (yellow card) 24'; Sameehg Doutie (yellow card) 85'	Report	Gregory Nelson (yellow card) 28'; Henrique Sereno (yellow card) 39'; Jeje Lalpekhlua 41'; Germanpreet Singh (yellow card) 82'; Rene Mihelic (yellow card) 90'	Stadium: JRD Tata Sports Complex; Attendance: 24212; Referee: Ranjit Bhakshi; MVP: Jeje Lalpekhlua (Chennaiyin FC)

7 January 2018 9	Chennaiyin FC	2–2	Delhi Dynamos	Chennai, India
17:30 IST (UTC+5:30)	Jeje Lalpekhlua 42', 51'	Report	David Ngaihte 24'; Guyon Fernandez 90'	Stadium: Jawaharlal Nehru Stadium (Chennai); Attendance: 14991; Referee: O.Thakur; MVP: Jeje Lalpekhlua (Chennaiyin FC)

13 January 2018 10	Chennaiyin FC	1–0	Pune City	Chennai, India
20:00 IST (UTC+5:30)	Iñigo Calderón (yellow card) 18'; Dhanpal Ganesh (yellow card) 28'; Gregory Nelson 83'	Report	Emiliano Alfaro (yellow card) 9'; Marcos Tebar (yellow card) 51'	Stadium: Jawaharlal Nehru Stadium (Chennai); Attendance: 13992; Referee: Raktim Shah; MVP: Mailson Alves (Chennaiyin FC)

19 January 2018 11	NorthEast United	3–1	Chennaiyin FC	Guwahati, India
20:00 IST (UTC+5:30)	Seiminlen Doungel 42', 46', 68'; (yellow card) 62'	Report	Henrique Sereno (yellow card) 20'; Gregory Nelson (yellow card) 74'; Anirudh Thapa 79'; Dhanpal Ganesh (yellow card) 90'	Stadium: Indira Gandhi Athletic Stadium; Attendance: 3211; Referee: Ranjit Bhakshi; MVP: Seiminlen Doungel (NorthEast United)

25 January 2018 12	ATK	1–2	Chennaiyin FC	Kolkata, India
20:00 IST (UTC+5:30)	Ryan Taylor (yellow card) 22'; Shankar Sampingiraj (yellow card) 39'; Martin Paterson 44'; Ashutosh Mehta (yellow card) 84'	Report	Mailson Alves 52'; Jeje Lalpekhlua 64' (yellow card) 90'; Jerry Lalrinzuala (yellow card) 89'	Stadium: Salt Lake Stadium; Attendance: 10065; Referee: Raul Gupta; MVP: Anirudh Thapa (Chennaiyin FC)

6 February 2018 13	Chennaiyin FC	1–3	Bengaluru	Chennai, India
20:00 IST (UTC+5:30)	Henrique Sereno (yellow card) 10' (yellow-red card) 71'; Francis Fernandes 33'; Dhanpal Ganesh (yellow card) 43'	Report	Boithang Haokip 2' (yellow card) 55'; John Johnson (yellow card) 51'; Dimas Delgado (yellow card) 53'; Miku 63'; Sunil Chhetri 90'	Stadium: Jawaharlal Nehru Stadium (Chennai); Attendance: 12499; Referee: Pranjal Banerji; MVP: Dimas Delgado (Bengaluru FC)

11 February 2018 14	Delhi Dynamos	1–1	Chennaiyin FC	Delhi, India
20:00 IST (UTC+5:30)	Kalu Uche 59' (pen.)	Report	Mailson Alves 81'	Stadium: Jawaharlal Nehru Stadium (Delhi); Attendance: 3784; MVP: Mailson Alves (Chennaiyin FC)

15 February 2018 15	Goa	0–1	Chennaiyin FC	Goa, India
20:00 IST (UTC+5:30)	Ferran Corominas (yellow card) 61'; Manuel Lanzarote (yellow card) 79'	Report	Dhanpal Ganesh (yellow card) 10'; Iñigo Calderón 53'; Bikramjit Singh (yellow card) 65'; Gregory Nelson (yellow card) 79'; Rene Mihelic (yellow card) 81'; Karanjit Singh (yellow card) 90'	Stadium: Fatorda Stadium; Attendance: 16842; Referee: O.Thakur; MVP: Mailson Alves (Chennaiyin FC)

18 February 2018 16	Chennaiyin FC	1–1	Jamshedpur	Chennai, India
17:30 IST (UTC+5:30)	Mailson Alves (yellow card) 71'; Henrique Sereno (yellow card) 76'; Mohammed Rafi 89'	Report	Wellington Priori 32' (yellow card) 76'	Stadium: Jawaharlal Nehru Stadium (Chennai); Attendance: 13195; Referee: A.Lairenlakpam; MVP: Wellington Priori (Jamshedpur FC)

23 February 2018 17	Kerala Blasters	0–0	Chennaiyin FC	Kochi, India
20:00 IST (UTC+5:30)	C.K. Vineeth (yellow card) 87'	Report	Henrique Sereno (yellow card) 80'	Stadium: Jawaharlal Nehru Stadium (Kochi); Attendance: 31259; Referee: M.Conger; MVP: Karanjit Singh (Chennaiyin FC)

3 March 2018 18	Chennaiyin FC	1–0	Mumbai City	Chennai, India
20:00 IST (UTC+5:30)	Rene Mihelic 67' (pen.); Germanpreet Singh (yellow card) 90'	Report	Zakeer Mundampara (yellow card) 19'; Leo Costa (yellow card) 22'; Sehnaj Singh (yellow card) 83'	Stadium: Jawaharlal Nehru Stadium (Chennai); Attendance: 12733; Referee: A.Rowan; MVP: Jaime Gavilán (Chennaiyin FC)

===== Playoffs =====
10 March 2018 Semi-Finals	Goa	1–1	Chennaiyin FC	Goa, India
20:00 IST	Manuel Lanzarote 64' (yellow card) 77'	Report	Jerry Lalrinzuala (yellow card) 27'; Anirudh Thapa 71'; Henrique Sereno (yellow card) 90'; Mailson Alves (yellow card) 90'	Stadium: Fatorda Stadium; Attendance: 18492; Referee: Santhosh Kumar; MVP: Gregory Nelson (Chennaiyin FC)

13 March 2018 Semi-Finals	Chennaiyin FC	3–0 (agg. 4–1)	Goa	Chennai, India
20:00 IST	Dhanpal Ganesh (yellow card) 13' (goal) 29'; Jeje Lalpekhlua 26', 90'; Raphael Augusto (yellow card) 60'; Jaime Gavilan (yellow card) 89'	Report	Hugo Boumous (yellow card) 60'; Seriton Fernandes (yellow card) 62'; Ferran Corominas (yellow card) 64'	Stadium: Jawaharlal Nehru Stadium (Chennai); Attendance: 19013; Referee: Turki Al Khudair; MVP: Mailson Alves (Chennaiyin FC)

===== Final =====
17 March 2018 Final	Bengaluru	2–3	Chennaiyin FC	Bengaluru, India
20:00 IST	Sunil Chhetri 7' (yellow card) 85'; Lenny Rodrigues (yellow card) 78'; Miku 90'	Report	Maílson Alves 17', 45'; Gregory Nelson (yellow card) 22'; Raphael Augusto 67'	Stadium: Sree Kanteerava Stadium; Attendance: 25,753; Referee: Ali Abdulnabi; MVP: Maílson Alves (Chennaiyin FC)

=== Indian Super Cup ===
As one of the top six teams in Indian Super League, Chennaiyin FC qualified for the main round in 2018 Indian Super Cup. Chennaiyin FC will meet the fifth placed I-League side Aizawl F.C. in Round of 16 match.

31 March 2018 Round of 16	Chennaiyin FC	2–2 (a.e.t.) (3–5 p)	Aizawl	Bhubaneswar, India
20:00 IST	Dhanpal Ganesh (yellow card) 34'; Bikramjit Singh (yellow card) 52'; Maílson Alves 89' (yellow card) 95'; Dhanachandra Singh 114'		Andrei Ionescu 22', 91'; Alfred K Jaryan (yellow card) 71'	Stadium: Kalinga Stadium; Attendance: 5,000; Referee: Pranjal Banerjee
	Penalties
	Bikramjit Singh (penalty scored); Mohammed Rafi (penalty missed); Dhanachandra Singh (penalty scored); Dhanpal Ganesh (penalty scored)		(penalty scored) Andrei Ionescu; (penalty scored) Dodoz; (penalty scored) Masih Saighani; (penalty scored) Lalchhawnkima; (penalty scored) H. Lalmuankima

== Squad statistics ==
As of Match played 31 March 2018

=== Appearances and goals ===
No.	Pos	Nat	Player	Total		ISL		Super Cup	
No.	Pos	Nat	Player	Apps	Goals	Apps	Goals	Apps	Goals
1	GK	(India) IND	Karanjit Singh	21	0	20	0	1	0
2	DF	(Portugal) POR	Henrique Sereno	18	1	18	1	0	0
6	MF	(India) IND	Bikramjit Singh	16	0	14+1	0	0+1	0
7	FW	(Netherlands) NED	Gregory Nelson	19	1	15+4	1	0	0
8	MF	(Spain) ESP	Jaime Gavilán	14	0	4+9	0	1	0
9	FW	(Nigeria) NGR	Jude Nworuh	11	0	4+6	0	1	0
10	MF	(Slovenia) SLO	Rene Mihelič	14	2	8+6	2	0	0
11	MF	(India) IND	Thoi Singh	11	0	5+5	0	0+1	0
12	FW	(India) IND	Jeje Lalpekhlua	20	9	19+1	9	0	0
13	GK	(India) IND	Pawan Kumar	1	0	1	0	0	0
14	DF	(Spain) ESP	Iñigo Calderón	20	3	20	3	0	0
15	MF	(India) IND	Anirudh Thapa	17	2	5+11	2	1	0
17	MF	(India) IND	Dhanpal Ganesh	18	2	17	2	1	0
18	DF	(India) IND	Jerry Lalrinzuala	21	0	20	0	1	0
19	MF	(Brazil) BRA	Raphael Augusto	18	3	14+4	3	0	0
20	FW	(India) IND	Mohammed Rafi	9	2	2+6	2	1	0
21	FW	(India) IND	Baoringdao Bodo	2	0	1+1	0	0	0
25	DF	(India) IND	Dhanachandra Singh	4	1	3	0	1	1
27	DF	(Brazil) BRA	Maílson Alves	20	5	19	4	1	1
28	MF	(India) IND	Germanpreet Singh	7	0	3+4	0	0	0
29	DF	(India) IND	Fulganco Cardozo	1	0	1	0	0	0
30	MF	(India) IND	Francis Fernandes	18	1	15+2	1	1	0
32	DF	(India) IND	Keenan Almeida	5	0	3+1	0	1	0
33	DF	(India) IND	Sanjay Balmuchu	1	0	0+1	0	0	0
36	GK	(India) IND	Shahinlal Meloly	0	0	0	0	0	0
NA	MF	(India) IND	Bedashwor Singh	1	0	0	0	0+1	0
Players who left Chennaiyin due to injury during the season:

=== Goal scorers ===
Place	Position	Nation	Number	Name	ISL	Super Cup	Total
1	FW	(India)	12	Jeje Lalpekhlua	9	0	9
2	DF	(Brazil)	27	Mailson Alves	4	1	5
3	DF	(Spain)	14	Iñigo Calderón	3	0	3
3	MF	(Brazil)	19	Raphael Augusto	3	0	3
5	FW	(India)	20	Mohammed Rafi	2	0	2
5	MF	(Slovenia)	10	Rene Mihelič	2	0	2
5	MF	(India)	15	Anirudh Thapa	2	0	2
5	MF	(India)	17	Dhanpal Ganesh	2	0	2
9	DF	(Portugal)	2	Henrique Sereno	1	0	1
9	MF	(Netherlands)	7	Gregory Nelson	1	0	1
9	MF	(India)	30	Francis Fernandes	1	0	1
9	DF	(India)	25	Dhanachandra Singh	0	1	1
9				Own goal	1	0	1
				TOTALS	31	2	33

=== Clean sheets ===
Rank	No.	Pos	Nat	Player	ISL	Super Cup	Total
1	1	GK	(India)	Karanjit Singh	7	0	7
2	13	GK	(India)	Pawan Kumar	1	0	1
3	36	GK	(India)	Shahinlal Meloly	0	0	0
TOTALS					8	0	8

=== Disciplinary record ===
Number	Nation	Position	Name	ISL			Super Cup			Total		
Number	Nation	Position	Name	Yellow card	(yellow card) (yellow-red card)	Red card	Yellow card	(yellow card) (yellow-red card)	Red card	Yellow card	(yellow card) (yellow-red card)	Red card
1	(India)	GK	Karanjit Singh	2	0	0	0	0	0	2	0	0
2	(Portugal)	DF	Henrique Sereno	8	1	0	0	0	0	8	1	0
6	(India)	MF	Bikramjit Singh	2	0	0	1	0	0	3	0	0
7	(Netherlands)	MF	Gregory Nelson	5	0	0	0	0	0	5	0	0
8	(Spain)	MF	Jaime Gavilán	1	0	0	0	0	0	1	0	0
10	(Slovenia)	MF	Rene Mihelič	2	0	0	0	0	0	2	0	0
12	(India)	FW	Jeje Lalpekhlua	1	0	0	0	0	0	1	0	0
14	(Spain)	DF	Iñigo Calderón	3	0	0	0	0	0	3	0	0
15	(India)	MF	Anirudh Thapa	1	0	0	0	0	0	1	0	0
17	(India)	MF	Dhanpal Ganesh	9	0	0	1	0	0	10	0	0
18	(India)	DF	Jerry Lalrinzuala	3	0	0	0	0	0	3	0	0
19	(Brazil)	MF	Raphael Augusto	3	0	0	0	0	0	3	0	0
27	(Brazil)	DF	Maílson Alves	5	0	0	1	0	0	6	0	0
28	(India)	MF	Germanpreet Singh	2	0	0	0	0	0	2	0	0
			TOTALS	47	1	0	3	0	0	50	1	0
