= 2019–20 Chennaiyin FC season =

2019–20 season of Chennaiyin FC

Chennaiyin
2019–2020 season
- Head Coach: John Gregory(First half)Owen Coyle
- Stadium: Jawaharlal Nehru Stadium, Chennai
- Indian Super League: 4th
- ISL finals: Runners up
- Top goalscorer: League: Nerijus Valskis (15); All: Nerijus Valskis (15)
Home colours	Away colours	Third colours

The 2019–20 Chennaiyin FC season was the club's sixth season since its establishment in 2014 and their sixth season in the Indian Super League.

== Players ==
Note: Flags indicate national team as defined under FIFA eligibility rules; some limited exceptions apply. Players may hold more than one non-FIFA nationality.

No.	Pos.	Nation	Player
1	GK	IND	Vishal Kaith
8	DF	IND	Edwin Sydney Vanspaul
13	DF	BRA	Eli Sabiá
18	DF	IND	Jerry Lalrinzuala
23	DF	IND	Aimol Reamsochung
7	MF	IND	Lallianzuala Chhangte
11	MF	IND	Thoi Singh
15	MF	IND	Anirudh Thapa
16	MF	IND	Sinivasan Pandiyan

No.	Pos.	Nation	Player
17	MF	IND	Dhanpal Ganesh
19	MF	IND	Abhijit Sarkar
22	MF	IND	Deepak Tangri
28	MF	IND	Germanpreet Singh
50	MF	BRA	Rafael Crivellaro
24	FW	IND	Rahim Ali

=== Technical staff ===
As of 3 August 2019

Position	Name
Head coach	(Scotland) Owen Coyle
Assistant coach	(Scotland) Sandy Stewart
Assistant coach and Head of Medicine and Performance	(Cyprus) Konstantinos Rostantis
Assistant coach	(India) Syed Sabir Pasha
Goalkeeping coach	(India) Karanjit Singh
Chief Technical Officer	(India) Amoy Ghoshal

== Transfers ==
=== Transfers in ===
Entry date	Position	No.	Player	From club	Transfer type	Ref.
9 June 2019	MF	8	(India) Edwin Sydney Vanspaul	(India) Chennai City	Free	
6 July 2019	FW	9	(Lithuania) Nerijus Valskis	(Israel) Hapoel Tel Aviv	Free	
13 August 2019	DF	6	(Romania) Lucian Goian	(India) Mumbai City	Free	
19 August 2019	DF	5	(Afghanistan) Masih Saighani	(Bangladesh) Abahani Dhaka	Free	
24 August 2019	MF	10	(Romania) Dragoș Firțulescu	(Bulgaria) Dunav Ruse	Free	
27 August 2019	FW	27	(Malta) André Schembri	(Cyprus) Apollon Limassol	Free	
30 August 2019	MF	7	(India) Lallianzuala Chhangte	(India) Odisha	Free	
31 August 2019	GK	31	(India) Vishal Kaith	(India) Pune City	Free	
3 September 2019	MF	50	(Brazil) Rafael Crivellaro	(Portugal) Feirense	Free	

=== Transfers out ===
Exit date	Position	No.	Player	To club	Transfer type	Ref.
31 March 2019	FW	8	(Palestine) Carlos Salom	(Thailand) Bangkok United	Loan return	
1 June 2019	FW	7	(Netherlands) Gregory Nelson	N/A	Free agent	
5 July 2019	MF	24	(India) Isaac Vanmalsawma	(India) Jamshedpur	Free	
5 July 2019	GK	39	(India) Nikhil Bernard	N/A	Free agent	
5 July 2019	DF	29	(Australia) Chris Herd	N/A	Free agent	
19 July 2019	MF	N/A	(India) Abhijit Sarkar	(India) East Bengal	Loan	
13 August 2019	DF	27	(Brazil) Maílson Alves	(Bangladesh) Dhaka Abahani	Free agent	
24 August 2019	MF	19	(Brazil) Raphael Augusto	(India) Bengaluru	Free	
26 August 2019	MF	21	(India) C. K. Vineeth	(India) Jamshedpur	Free	
31 August 2019	MF	30	(India) Francis Fernandes	N/A	Free agent	

== Competitions ==
Win Draw Loss Cancelled

Chennaiyin travelled to the TransStadia in Ahmedabad and JRD Tata Sports Complex in Jamshedpur for their pre-season tour ahead of the new season.

There, the club was set to play friendlies with Ahmedabad's ARA club on September 15 whereas they will start Ahmedabad campaign on September 1.

On September 20, Chennaiyin will travel to Jamshedpur. Its opponents and dates for preseason friendlies in Jamshedpur will be confirmed later.

Chennaiyin FC, Gokulam Kerala FC play out draw in pre-season friendly on October 8.

15 September 2019 Friendly	ARA	1–3	Chennaiyin	Ahmedabad, India
	?	Report	André Schembri; Rahim Ali; Nerijus Valskis (pen.)	Stadium: TransStadia

8 October 2019 Friendly	Chennaiyin	1-1	Gokulam Kerala	Jawaharlal Nehru Stadium
	Crivellaro (pen.)	Report	Andre Ettienne	Stadium: Chennai, India

=== Indian Super League ===
==== Standings ====
Pos	Team	Pld	W	D	L	GF	GA	GD	Pts	Qualification
2	ATK (Note: Originally, Mohun Bagan, the 2019–20 I-League champions (they were already assured of the title before the league was abandoned due to the COVID-19 pandemic in India), would qualify as India 2 (2021 AFC Cup group stage), and ATK, the 2020 Indian Super League playoffs winners, would qualify as India 3 (2021 AFC Cup qualifying play-offs). However, ATK owners KGSPL ceased their football operation and bought majority stakes in Mohun Bagan FC (India) Private Limited and rebranded Mohun Bagan football team as ATK Mohun Bagan FC from the 2020–21 Indian Super League which qualified as India 2 in 2021 AFC club competition. The All India Football Federation decided that Bengaluru FC, the 2019–20 Indian Super League regular season 3rd place (behind FC Goa, which qualified for the 2021 AFC Champions League, and ATK), will qualify as India 3.) (C)	18	10	4	4	33	16	+17	34	Advance to ISL playoffs
3	Bengaluru	18	8	6	4	22	13	+9	30	Qualification for 2021 AFC Cup play-off round and ISL playoffs
4	Chennaiyin	18	8	5	5	32	26	+6	29	Advance to ISL playoffs
5	Mumbai City	18	7	5	6	25	29	−4	26	
6	Odisha	18	7	4	7	28	31	−3	25	

Source: Indian Super League
Rules for classification: 1) points; 2) head-to-head points; 3) head-to-head goal difference; 4) head-to-head goals scored; 5) goal difference; 5) number of goals scored; 6) fair play ranking; 6) drawing of lots
(C) Champions

==== League results by round ====
Round	1	2	3	4	5	6	7	8	9	10	11	12	13	14	15	16	17	18
Ground	A	H	H	A	H	H	A	H	H	A	A	H	H	H	H	A	A	A
Result	L	D	L	L	W	D	D	W	L	L	W	W	W	W	D	W	W	D
Position	9	8	10	10	9	9	9	8	8	9	7	6	6	5	5	5	4	4

Updated to match(es) played on 26 December 2019. Source: Matchday
A = Away; H = Home; W = Win; D = Draw; L = Loss

==== Matchday ====
23 October 2019 1	Goa	3–0	Chennaiyin	Margao, Goa
19:30 IST (UTC+05:30)	Rodrigues (yellow card) 15'; Doungel 30'; Coro 62'; Peña 81'	Report	Goian (yellow card) 80'	Stadium: Fatorda Stadium; Attendance: 13,017; Referee: Banerjee; Man of the Match: Fernandes (Goa)

27 October 2019 2	Chennaiyin	0–0	Mumbai City	Chennai
19:30 IST (UTC+05:30)		Report	Fernandes (yellow card) 29'; Borges (yellow card) 33'; Chakrabarti (yellow card) 48' (yellow-red card) 90+4'; Larbi (yellow card) 56'	Stadium: Jawaharlal Nehru Stadium; Referee: Gupta; Man of the Match: Golui (Mumbai)

30 October 2019 3	Chennaiyin	0–1	ATK	Chennai
19:30 IST (UTC+05:30)	Valskis (yellow card) 90+3'	Report	Williams 48'	Stadium: Jawaharlal Nehru Stadium; Referee: Saha; Man of the Match: Williams (ATK)

10 November 2019 4	Bengaluru	3–0	Chennaiyin	Bengaluru
19:30 IST (UTC+05:30)	Paartalu 14'; Chhetri 25' (yellow card) 75'; Semboi 84'	Report	Valskis (yellow card) 45'; Dhanpal (yellow card) 61'; Kaith (yellow card) 90+1'	Stadium: Sree Kanteerava Stadium; Attendance: 16,219; Referee: Metei

25 November 2019 5	Chennaiyin	2–1	Hyderabad	Chennai
19:30 IST (UTC+05:30)	Thapa (yellow card) 48'; Firțulescu (yellow card) 84'; Schembri 90+2' (yellow card) 90+2'; Valskis 90+6' (yellow card) 90+7'	Report	Bobô (yellow card) 61'; Singh (yellow card) 84'; Kilgallon 90+5'	Stadium: Jawaharlal Nehru Stadium; Referee: Metei; Man of the Match: Thapa (Chennaiyin)

28 November 2019 6	Chennaiyin	2–2	Odisha	Chennai
19:30 IST (UTC+05:30)	Singh (yellow card) 49'; Valskis 51', 71'	Report	Rai (yellow card) 22'; Hernández 54'; Delgado (yellow card) 66'; Santana 82'	Stadium: Jawaharlal Nehru Stadium; Attendance: 8,693; Referee: Bora; Man of the Match: Valskis (Chennaiyin)

9 December 2019 7	Jamshedpur	1–1	Chennaiyin	Jamshedpur
19:30 IST (UTC+05:30)	Vanmalsawma 89'	Report	Valskis 26'; Saighani (yellow card) 34'; Crivellaro (yellow card) 49'; Goian (yellow card) 90+2'	Stadium: JRD Tata Sports Complex; Attendance: 20,304; Referee: John; Man of the Match: Choudhary (Jamshedpur)

20 December 2019 8	Chennaiyin	3–1	Kerala Blasters	Chennai
19:30 IST (UTC+05:30)	Schembri 4'; Chhangte 30'; Valskis 40'; Singh (yellow card) 44'; Sabiá (yellow card) 52' (yellow-red card) 90+3'; Kaith (yellow card) 83'	Report	Ogbeche 15' (yellow card) 37'	Stadium: Jawaharlal Nehru Stadium; Attendance: 11,597; Referee: Thakur; Man of the Match: Chhangte (Chennaiyin)

26 December 2019 9	Chennaiyin	3–4	Goa	Chennai
19:30 IST (UTC+05:30)	Schembri 57'; Crivellaro 59', 90' (yellow card) 84'; Goian (yellow card) 65'; Vanspaul (yellow card) 85' (yellow-red card) 90+2'; Thapa (yellow card) 90+3'; Singh (yellow card) 90+4'	Report	Rodrigues (yellow card) 26'; Jahouh 26'; Fernandes 41'; Fall (yellow card) 44'; Boumous 45+1'; Coro 63'; Nawaz (yellow card) 79'; Peña (yellow card) 82'	Stadium: Jawaharlal Nehru Stadium; Attendance: 9,531; Referee: Bora; Man of the Match: Jahouh (Goa)

6 January 2020 10	Odisha	2-0	Chennaiyin	Bhubaneshwar
19:30 IST (UTC+05:30)	Jerry 37'; Vinit 41'	Report		Stadium: Kalinga Stadium

10 January 2020 11	Hyderabad	1-3	Chennaiyin	Hyderabad
19:30 IST (UTC+05:30)		Report	Crivellaro 40', Valskis 43' 63'	Stadium: G. M. C. Balayogi Athletic Stadium

16 January 2020 12	Chennaiyin	2-0	NorthEast United	Chennai
19:30 IST (UTC+05:30)	Crivellaro 57'; Valskis 59'	Report		Stadium: Jawaharlal Nehru Stadium

23 January 2020 13	Chennaiyin	4-1	Jamshedpur	Chennai
19:30 IST (UTC+05:30)	Valskis 13' 74'; Schembri 42'; Chhangte 87'	Report		Stadium: Jawaharlal Nehru Stadium

1 February 2020 14	Kerala Blasters	3-6	Chennaiyin	Kochi
19:30 IST (UTC+05:30)	Ogbeche 48' 65' 76'	Report	Crivellaro 39' 45+1'; Valskis 45' 90+2'; Chhangte 59' 80'	Stadium: Jawaharlal Nehru Stadium; Attendance: 9084; Referee: Umesh Bora

7 February 2020 15	Chennaiyin	0-0	Bengaluru	Chennai
19:30 IST (UTC+05:30)		Report		Stadium: Jawaharlal Nehru Stadium; Attendance: 10953; Referee: Crystal John

16 February 2020 16	ATK	1-3	Chennaiyin	Kolkata
19:30 IST (UTC+05:30)	Krishna 40'	Report	Crivellaro 7'; Schembri; 39'; Valskis 90+4'	Stadium: Salt Lake Stadium; Attendance: 37406; Referee: Muhammad Taqi

16 February 2020 17	Mumbai City	0-1	Chennaiyin	Mumbai
19:30 IST (UTC+05:30)		Report	Goian 83'	Stadium: Mumbai Football Arena; Attendance: 5817; Referee: Gupta

25 February 2020 18	NorthEast United	2-2	Chennaiyin	Guwahati
19:30 IST (UTC+05:30)	Cháves 43' (pen.) 71'	Report	Saighani 17'; Chhangte 90+3'	Stadium: Indira Gandhi Athletic Stadium; Referee: Banerjee

=== Squad appearances and goals ===
No.	Pos	Nat	Player	Total		ISL		Super Cup	
No.	Pos	Nat	Player	Apps	Goals	Apps	Goals	Apps	Goals
Goalkeepers
1	GK	(India) IND	Karanjit Singh	1	0	1	0	0	0
31	GK	(India) IND	Vishal Kaith	17	0	17	0	0	0
33	GK	(India) IND	Sanjiban Ghosh	0	0	0	0	0	0
Defenders
3	DF	(India) IND	Tondonba Singh	8	0	8	0	0	0
5	DF	(Afghanistan) AFG	Masih Saighani	12	1	12	1	0	0
6	DF	(Romania) ROU	Lucian Goian	20	2	20	2	0	0
8	DF	(India) IND	Edwin Sydney Vanspaul	16	0	16	0	0	0
13	DF	(Brazil) BRA	Eli Sabiá	19	1	19	1	0	0
18	DF	(India) IND	Jerry Lalrinzuala	10	0	10	0	0	0
25	DF	(India) IND	Zohmingliana Ralte	0	0	0	0	0	0
26	DF	(India) IND	Laldinliana Renthlei	7	0	7	0	0	0
35	DF	(India) IND	Hendry Antonay	0	0	0	0	0	0
37	DF	(India) IND	Reamsochung Aimol	0	0	0	0	0	0
Midfielders
7	MF	(India) IND	Lallianzuala Chhangte	21	7	21	7	0	0
10	MF	(Romania) ROU	Dragoș Firțulescu	15	0	15	0	0	0
11	MF	(India) IND	Thoi Singh	12	0	12	0	0	0
15	MF	(India) IND	Anirudh Thapa	20	1	20	1	0	0
16	MF	(India) IND	Sinivasan Pandiyan	0	0	0	0	0	0
17	MF	(India) IND	Dhanpal Ganesh	4	0	4	0	0	0
22	MF	(India) IND	Deepak Tangri	3	0	3	0	0	0
28	MF	(India) IND	Germanpreet Singh	9	0	9	0	0	0
50	MF	(Brazil) BRA	Rafael Crivellaro	20	7	20	7	0	0
Forwards
9	FW	(Lithuania) LTU	Nerijus Valskis	20	15	20	15	0	0
12	FW	(India) IND	Jeje Lalpekhlua	0	0	0	0	0	0
24	FW	(India) IND	Rahim Ali	5	0	5	0	0	0
27	FW	(Malta) MLT	André Schembri	18	5	18	5	0	0
45	FW	(India) IND	Bawlte Rohmingthanga	0	0	0	0	0	0

== Squad statistics ==
	ISL	Super Cup	Total
Games played	17	0	17
Games won	8	0	8
Games drawn	4	0	4
Games lost	5	0	5
Goals scored	30	0	30
Goals conceded	26	0	26
Goal difference	6	0	6
Clean sheets	4	0	4
Goal by Substitute	0	0	3
Yellow cards	29	0	29
Red cards	3	0	3

=== Goalscorers ===
No.	Pos.	Nation	Name	ISL	Super Cup	Total
9	MF	(Lithuania)	Nerijus Valskis	15	0	15
50	MF	(Brazil)	Rafael Crivellaro	7	0	7
7	MF	(India)	Lallianzuala Chhangte	7	0	7
27	FW	(Malta)	André Schembri	5	0	5
6	DF	(Romania)	Lucian Goian	2	0	2
5	DF	(Afghanistan)	Masih Saighani	1	0	1
13	DF	(Brazil)	Eli Sabia	1	0	1
15	MF	(India)	Anirudh Thapa	1	0	1
TOTAL				36	0	36

Source: Player Stats

=== Clean sheets ===
No.	Nation	Name	ISL	Super Cup	Total Clean Sheets	Games played
13	(India)	Vishal Kaith	15	0	3	15
TOTAL			3	0	3	15

=== Disciplinary record ===
No.	Pos.	Nation	Name	ISL			Super Cup			Total		
No.	Pos.	Nation	Name	Yellow card	Second yellow card	Red card	Yellow card	Second yellow card	Red card	Yellow card	Second yellow card	Red card
1	GK	(India)	Karanjit Singh	0	0	0	0	0	0	0	0	0
31	GK	(India)	Vishal Kaith	2	0	0	0	0	0	2	0	0
33	GK	(India)	Sanjiban Ghosh	0	0	0	0	0	0	0	0	0
42	GK	(India)	Samik Mitra	0	0	0	0	0	0	0	0	0
3	DF	(India)	Tondonba Singh	0	0	0	0	0	0	0	0	0
5	DF	(Afghanistan)	Masih Saighani	1	0	0	0	0	0	1	0	0
6	DF	(Romania)	Lucian Goian	3	0	0	0	0	0	3	0	0
8	DF	(India)	Edwin Sydney Vanspaul	2	1	0	0	0	0	2	1	0
13	DF	(Brazil)	Eli Sabiá	2	1	0	0	0	0	2	1	0
18	DF	(India)	Jerry Lalrinzuala	0	0	0	0	0	0	0	0	0
25	DF	(India)	Zohmingliana Ralte	0	0	0	0	0	0	0	0	0
26	MF	(India)	Laldinliana Renthlei	1	0	0	0	0	0	1	0	0
28	DF	(India)	Germanpreet Singh	4	0	0	0	0	0	4	0	0
35	DF	(India)	Hendry Antonay	0	0	0	0	0	0	0	0	0
37	DF	(India)	Reamsochung Aimol	0	0	0	0	0	0	0	0	0
7	MF	(India)	Lallianzuala Chhangte	0	0	0	0	0	0	0	0	0
10	MF	(Romania)	Dragoș Firțulescu	1	0	0	0	0	0	1	0	0
11	MF	(India)	Thoi Singh	2	1	0	0	0	0	2	1	0
15	MF	(India)	Anirudh Thapa	4	0	0	0	0	0	4	0	0
16	MF	(India)	Sinivasan Pandiyan	0	0	0	0	0	0	0	0	0
22	MF	(India)	Deepak Tangri	0	0	0	0	0	0	0	0	0
17	MF	(India)	Dhanpal Ganesh	1	0	0	0	0	0	1	0	0
50	MF	(Brazil)	Rafael Crivellaro	2	0	0	0	0	0	2	0	0
9	FW	(Lithuania)	Nerijus Valskis	3	0	0	0	0	0	3	0	0
12	FW	(India)	Jeje Lalpekhlua	0	0	0	0	0	0	0	0	0
27	FW	(India)	André Schembri	1	0	0	0	0	0	1	0	0
45	FW	(India)	Bawlte Rohmingthanga	0	0	0	0	0	0	0	0	0
24	FW	(India)	Rahim Ali	0	0	0	0	0	0	0	0	0
TOTAL				29	3	0	0	0	0	23	2	0
