= 2018–19 Chennaiyin FC season =

2018–19 season of Chennaiyin FC

Chennaiyin
2018–2019 season
- Head Coach: John Gregory
- Stadium: Jawaharlal Nehru Stadium, Chennai
- Indian Super League: 10th
- Super Cup: Runners up
- AFC Cup: Group stage
Home colours	Away colours
- All statistics correct as of 10 July 2018.

The 2018–19 Chennaiyin FC season was the club's fifth season since its establishment in 2014 and their fifth season in the Indian Super League. They will also play in the 2019 AFC Cup. This is the first time an ISL club will play in any continental championship.

== Transfers ==
=== Pre-season ===
In: Note: Flags indicate national team as defined under FIFA eligibility rules; some limited exceptions apply. Players may hold more than one non-FIFA nationality.

No.	Pos.	Nation	Player

Out: Note: Flags indicate national team as defined under FIFA eligibility rules; some limited exceptions apply. Players may hold more than one non-FIFA nationality.

No.	Pos.	Nation	Player

== Squad ==
As of 1 October 2018

Note: Flags indicate national team as defined under FIFA eligibility rules; some limited exceptions apply. Players may hold more than one non-FIFA nationality.

No.	Pos.	Nation	Player
1	GK	IND	Karanjit Singh
33	GK	IND	Sanjiban Ghosh
39	GK	IND	Nikhil Bernard
26	DF	IND	Laldinliana Renthlei
35	DF	IND	Hendry Antonay
13	DF	BRA	Eli Sabiá
27	DF	BRA	Maílson Alves (Captain)
25	DF	IND	Zohmingliana Ralte
18	DF	IND	Jerry Lalrinzuala
3	DF	IND	Tondonba Singh
17	MF	IND	Dhanpal Ganesh
28	MF	IND	Germanpreet Singh

No.	Pos.	Nation	Player
16	MF	IND	Sinivasan Pandiyan
15	MF	IND	Anirudh Thapa
19	MF	BRA	Raphael Augusto
34	MF	IND	Zonunmawia
30	MF	IND	Francis Fernandes
11	MF	IND	Thoi Singh
24	MF	IND	Isaac Vanmalsawma
49	MF	IND	Bedashwor Singh
12	FW	IND	Jeje Lalpekhlua
20	FW	IND	Mohammed Rafi

=== Out on loan ===
Note: Flags indicate national team as defined under FIFA eligibility rules; some limited exceptions apply. Players may hold more than one non-FIFA nationality.

No.	Pos.	Nation	Player
—	DF	IND	Prosenjit Chakroborty (to Mohammedan)
—	DF	IND	Deepak Tangri (to Indian Arrows)

No.	Pos.	Nation	Player
—	MF	IND	Abhijit Sarkar (to Indian Arrows)
—	FW	IND	Rahim Ali (to Indian Arrows)

=== Technical staff ===
As of 6 Aug 2018

Position	Name
Head Coach	(England) John Gregory
Assistant Coach	(England) Paul Groves
Assistant Coach	(India) Syed Sabir Pasha
Sports Scientist	(England) Niall Clark
Goalkeeping Coach	(England) Kevin Hitchcock
Physiotherapist	(Germany) Robert Gilbert

== Pre-season and friendlies ==
Chennayin FC started their pre-season in Malaysia on 14 August under the watchful eyes of John Gregory. The team is supposed to play four warm-up matches and will return to Chennai on September 11.

In the first friendly, Chennaiyin played with Malaysia U19 and drew the match. Playing against Malaysia Premier League team MIFA, Chennaiyin won in penalties by 3-2 after regulation time ended in 1-1. They played their third match against Felda United and drew that match. Chennaiyin played their last match of Malaysian sojourn against Terengganu FC and lost it 2-1.

29 August 2018 Friendly	Malaysia U19	0–0	Chennaiyin FC	Selangor, Malaysia
15:00 IST		Report		Stadium: Wisma FAM

4 September 2018 Friendly	MIFA	1–1 (3-2)(p)	Chennaiyin FC	Selangor, Malaysia
18:30 IST	Jeje	Report	Goal	Stadium: Petaling Jaya Stadium

7 September 2018 Friendly	Felda United	1–1	Chennaiyin FC	Selangor, Malaysia
18:00 IST	Goal	Report	Gregory Nelson 90'	Stadium: UiTM Stadium

10 September 2018 Friendly	Terengganu FC	2-1	Chennaiyin FC	Setiawangsa, Malaysia
14:30 IST	Dong; Malik	Report	Salom	Stadium: MSN Sports Complex Ground

== Competitions ==
=== Indian Super League ===
==== League table ====
Pos	Team	Pld	W	D	L	GF	GA	GD	Pts
6	ATK	18	6	6	6	18	22	−4	24
7	Pune City	18	6	4	8	24	30	−6	22
8	Delhi Dynamos	18	4	6	8	23	27	−4	18
9	Kerala Blasters	18	2	9	7	18	28	−10	15
10	Chennaiyin	18	2	3	13	16	32	−16	9

Source: Indian Super League
Rules for classification: 1) points; 2) head-to-head points; 3) head-to-head goal difference; 4) head-to-head goals scored; 5) goal difference; 5) number of goals scored; 6) fair play ranking; 6) drawing of lots
