= Tondonba Singh Ngasepam =

Indian footballer

Tondonba Singh
Personal information
- Full name: Tondonba Singh Ngasepam
- Date of birth: 14 November 1994 (age 32)
- Place of birth: Manipur, India
- Height: 1.69 m (5 ft 6 1/2 in)
- Position: Left back

Team information
- Current team: NorthEast United
- Number: 3

Youth career
- NEROCA

Senior career*
| Years | Team | Apps | (Gls) |
| 2017–2018 | NEROCA | 18 | (0) |
| 2018–2020 | Chennaiyin | 19 | (0) |
| 2020–2021 | Mumbai City | 2 | (0) |
| 2021– | NorthEast United | 31 | (0) |
- * Club domestic league appearances and goals as of 19:02, 19 January 2023 (UTC)

Tondonba Singh Ngasepam (Meitei: Ngasepam Tondonba Singh, born 14 November 1994), is an Indian professional footballer who plays as a defender for Indian Super League club NorthEast United.

== Career ==
Born in Manipur, to a Hindu Meitei family. Singh began his career with local side NEROCA at the age of 11. He soon then rose through the ranks at the club and made his senior debut in the Manipur State League at the age of 16. He continued to play for the club in the I-League 2nd Division and was part of the side that earned promotion to the I-League, one of India's top leagues.

Singh made his professional debut for the club in the I-League on 1 December 2017 in their opening match against Minerva Punjab. He started and played the full match as NEROCA lost 2–1. He would go on to play in every match for NEROCA as they finished in second place during their debut top flight season.

=== Chennaiyin ===
At the conclusion of the 2017–18 season, Singh signed a pre-contract agreement with Chennaiyin of the Indian Super League. In the 2019–20 season, he became the starting left back for Chennayin, winning the spot from Jerry Lalrinzuala.

=== NorthEast United ===
On 7 September 2021, NorthEast United confirmed the signing of Tondonba Singh on its social media and various other platforms for the 2021–22 season.

== Career statistics ==
=== Club ===
As of 19 January 2023

| Club | Season | League | | | Cup | | Continental | | Total | |
| Club | Season | Division | Apps | Goals | Apps | Goals | Apps | Goals | Apps | Goals |
|---|---|---|---|---|---|---|---|---|---|---|
| NEROCA | 2017–18 | I-League | 18 | 0 | 2 (Note: Appearances in the Super Cup) | 0 | — | | 20 | 0 |
| Chennaiyin | 2018–19 | Indian Super League | 10 | 0 | 3 | 0 | 4 (Note: Appearances in the AFC Champions League) (Note: Appearances in the AFC Cup) | 0 | 17 | 0 |
| Chennaiyin | 2019–20 | Indian Super League | 9 | 0 | 0 | 0 | — | | 9 | 0 |
| Mumbai City | 2020–21 | Indian Super League | 2 | 0 | 0 | 0 | — | | 2 | 0 |
| NorthEast United | 2021–22 | Indian Super League | 9 | 0 | 0 | 0 | — | | 9 | 0 |
| NorthEast United | 2022–23 | Indian Super League | 4 | 0 | 1 (Note: Appearances in the Durand Cup) | 0 | — | | 5 | 0 |
| Career total | | | 52 | 0 | 6 | 0 | 4 | 0 | 62 | 0 |

== Honours ==
NorthEast United

- Durand Cup: 2024, 2025
