= Éder Monteiro =

Brazilian footballer

Personal information
- Full name: Éder Monteiro Fernandes
- Date of birth: 21 September 1983 (age 43)
- Place of birth: São Paulo, Brazil
- Height: 1.83 m (6 ft 0 in)
- Position: Centre-back

Senior career*
Years	Team	Apps	(Gls)
2001–2003	Independência		
2003–2005	Americano RJ		
2005–2006	Vasco da Gama	28	(2)
2006–2009	Noroeste	22	(0)
2009	Goytacaz		
2009–2010	Itumbiara		
2010–2011	Grêmio Anápolis		
2011–2013	Rio Ave	29	(0)
2012–2013	→ Kerkyra (loan)	26	(0)
2013–2015	Nea Salamis Famagusta	46	(2)
2015	Chennaiyin	2	(0)
2016	Salgaocar	11	(0)
2016	Chennaiyin	3	(0)
2017	Taubaté	6	(0)
2018	Barretos	12	(0)
- * Club domestic league appearances and goals

Éder Monteiro Fernandes, sometimes known as just Éder (born 21 September 1983), is a Brazilian former professional footballer who played as a defender.

== Career ==
Monteiro kicked off his professional career in 2001 with Independência. This was followed by his stints at Americano RJ and Vasco da Gama, the latter in the country's top tier where his teammate was World Cup winner Romário. In September 2010, Éder Monteiro signed for Portuguese Primeira Liga club Rio Ave but he could get international clearance two weeks later. In 2013, he was loaned to the Greek club Kerkyra.

=== India ===
After playing two seasons with the Cypriot club Nea Salamis between 2013 and 2015, Éder Monteiro switched clubs and countries by signing for Indian Super League franchise Chennaiyin FC in August 2015, where he joined Elano and Bernard Mendy. Upon signing the contract, he said he would bring his "experience of playing in other leagues of Europe" and that he would also "learn a lot" by playing under Marco Materazzi. He made his debut for the franchise on 5 December, against FC Pune City, coming as a 77th-minute substitute for Manuele Blasi in a 1–0 victory. He made a further appearance in Chennaiyin's 3–0 triumph over Atletico de Kolkata replacing Jeje Lalpekhlua in the last minute of the match.

After the league was over, Éder Monteiro signed for I-League club Salgaocar, becoming the fourth and final foreigner for the Malky Thomson-led side. Joining Chennaiyin teammates Karanjit Singh and Gilbert Oliveira at the new club, he said that they would help him to settle in his new club. He made his league debut against Aizawl FC where, along with Augustin Fernandes and Reagan Singh, he played as one of the back three.

== Career statistics ==
As of 28 February 2016

Club	Season	League			Cup		Continental		Total	
Club	Season	Division	Apps	Goals	Apps	Goals	Apps	Goals	Apps	Goals
Americano RJ	2004	Série C					—			
Americano RJ	2005	Série C					—			
Americano RJ	Total						—			
Vasco da Gama	2005	Série A	17	1			—		17	1
Vasco da Gama	2006	Série A	11	1			—		11	1
Vasco da Gama	Total		28	2			—		28	2
Noroeste	2007	Série C	22	0			—		22	0
Noroeste	2008	Série C					—			
Noroeste	2009	Série D					—			
Noroeste	Total		22	0			—		22	0
Goytacaz	2009	Série D					—			
Itumbiara	2010	Série D					—			
Grêmio Anápolis	2010	Série D					—			
Rio Ave	2010–11	Primeira Liga	9	0	1	0	—		10	0
Rio Ave	2011–12	Primeira Liga	20	0	2	0	—		22	0
Rio Ave	Total		29	0	3	0	—		32	0
Kerkyra	2012–13	Super League Greece	26	0	3	0	—		29	0
Nea Salamis	2012–13	Cypriot First Division	25	1	0	0	—		25	1
Nea Salamis	2014–15	Cypriot First Division	21	1	2	0	—		23	1
Nea Salamis	Total		46	2	2	0	—		48	2
Chennaiyin FC	2015	Indian Super League	2	0	—		—		2	0
Salgaocar	2015–16	I-League	5	0	—		—		5	0
Career total			158	4	8	0	0	0	166	4

== Honors ==
Chennaiyin

- Indian Super League: 2015
