= Jaime Gavilán =

Spanish footballer

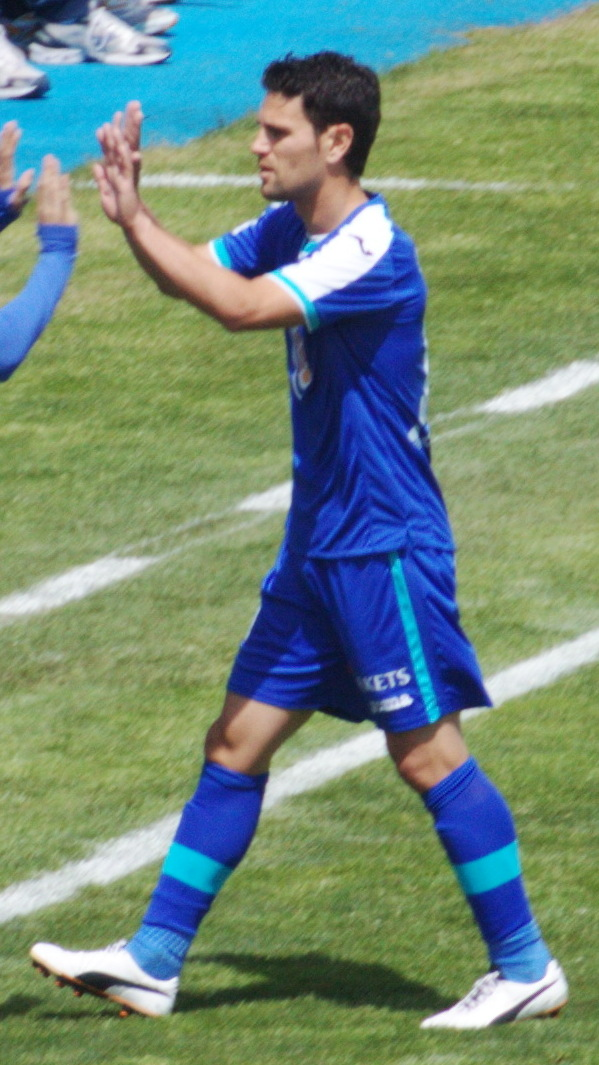
- Gavilán with Getafe in 2012

Personal information
- Full name: Jaime Gavilán Martínez
- Date of birth: 12 May 1985 (age 41)
- Place of birth: Valencia, Spain
- Height: 1.77 m (5 ft 10 in)
- Position: Midfielder

Youth career
- Sporting Benimaclet
- 2000–2002: Valencia

Senior career*
Years	Team	Apps	(Gls)
2002–2004	Valencia B	45	(7)
2004–2008	Valencia	17	(0)
2004–2005	→ Tenerife (loan)	30	(3)
2005–2006	→ Getafe (loan)	32	(4)
2007–2008	→ Getafe (loan)	16	(1)
2008–2014	Getafe	136	(6)
2014–2015	Levante	2	(0)
2015	Platanias	8	(0)
2015	ATK	16	(0)
2016–2017	Suwon	23	(3)
2017–2018	Chennaiyin	13	(0)
2018–2019	Alcorcón	8	(0)
2019–2021	S.S. Reyes	19	(1)
Total		365	(25)

International career
2000–2001	Spain U16	10	(2)
2001–2003	Spain U17	21	(10)
2002–2004	Spain U19	7	(2)
2003–2005	Spain U20	13	(0)
2004–2006	Spain U21	10	(1)
Medal record
Men's football
Representing Spain
FIFA U-20 World Cup
Runner-up	2003
UEFA European Under-19 Championship
Winner	2004 Switzerland
UEFA European Under-16 Championship
Winner	2001 England
- * Club domestic league appearances and goals

Jaime Gavilán Martínez (born 12 May 1985) is a Spanish former professional footballer who played as a left midfielder.

He amassed La Liga totals of 203 games and 11 goals over the course of 11 seasons, representing mainly in the competition Valencia and Getafe. In a 19-year career, he also appeared for clubs in Greece, India and South Korea.

Gavilán played for Spain at youth level.

== Club career ==
=== Valencia ===
Born in Valencia, Valencian Community, Gavilán was a Valencia CF youth product. He made his first-team – and La Liga – debut one month shy of his 18th birthday, playing 12 minutes in a 1–0 away defeat against Real Valladolid on 19 April 2003. He also spent two full seasons with the reserves in the Segunda División B.

Gavilán was gradually breaking into the main squad after two loans, at CD Tenerife in the Segunda División and Getafe CF. However, when new head coach Ronald Koeman arrived in November 2007, he was deemed surplus to requirements and was loaned again to Getafe until the end of the season; the previous campaign, he had suffered a serious knee ligament injury that kept him out of action for of six months.

Gavilán featured prominently in his second spell with the Madrid outskirts side, scoring in a 2–1 home win over Racing de Santander on 16 March 2008. He was also part of their quarter-final run in the UEFA Cup, making three appearances as a starter.

=== Getafe ===
On 15 July 2008, Gavilán signed a permanent four-year deal with Getafe. He was ever-present during his first full season and, on 12 April 2009, scored the game's only goal in an important victory at Sevilla FC.

In 2009–10, Gavilán featured in 27 scoreless matches as Getafe qualified for the second time ever for Europe after finishing in sixth position. On 6 March 2011, in the last minutes of the first half of a 2–0 loss away to Sporting de Gijón, he suffered the same injury to his knee, being sidelined for the rest of the campaign.

=== Levante ===
The free agent Gavilán joined fellow top division club Levante UD in June 2014, on a one-year contract with an option to extend for a further two. On 30 January 2015, having totalled just six games in all competitions, he severed his ties.

=== Abroad ===
Following a brief spell in Greece with Platanias FC, Gavilán signed for Atlético de Kolkata of the Indian Super League on 18 June 2015. Subsequently, he represented South Korea's Suwon FC before returning to India with Chennaiyin FC, where he won the national championship.

=== Later career ===
Gavilán moved to second-tier AD Alcorcón on 6 July 2018. His last club was lowly UD San Sebastián de los Reyes, before retiring in 2021 aged 36.

== International career ==
Gavilán helped Spain to win the 2004 UEFA European Under-19 Championship held in Switzerland, scoring in group-stage victories against Germany (3–0) and Poland (4–1). In the run up to the 2006 FIFA World Cup, Luis Aragonés called him up to a senior team get-together, but he was ultimately not part of the squad at the finals and never earned a full cap.

== Career statistics ==
As of match played on 31 March 2018

Club	Season	League			Cup		Continental		Total	
Club	Season	Division	Apps	Goals	Apps	Goals	Apps	Goals	Apps	Goals
Valencia	2002–03	La Liga	2	0	0	0	0	0	2	0
Valencia	2003–04	La Liga	0	0	0	0	0	0	0	0
Valencia	2006–07	La Liga	12	0	1	0	4 (Note: Appearances in UEFA Champions League)	0	17	0
Valencia	2007–08	La Liga	3	0	0	0	3	0	6	0
Valencia	Total		17	0	1	0	7	0	25	0
Tenerife (loan)	2004–05	Segunda División	30	3	2	1	—		32	4
Getafe (loan)	2005–06	La Liga	32	4	3	1	—		35	5
Getafe (loan)	2007–08	La Liga	16	1	5	2	3 (Note: Appearances in UEFA Cup)	0	24	3
Getafe	2008–09	La Liga	32	3	2	0	—		34	3
Getafe	2009–10	La Liga	27	0	2	1	—		29	1
Getafe	2010–11	La Liga	18	2	1	0	3 (Note: Appearances in UEFA Europa League)	0	22	2
Getafe	2011–12	La Liga	17	1	1	0	—		18	1
Getafe	2012–13	La Liga	22	0	4	2	—		26	2
Getafe	2013–14	La Liga	20	0	3	0	—		23	0
Getafe	Total		184	11	21	6	6	0	211	17
Levante	2014–15	La Liga	2	0	4	0	—		6	0
Platanias	2014–15	Super League Greece	8	0	0	0	—		8	0
ATK	2015	Indian Super League	16	0	—		—		16	0
Suwon	2016	K League Classic	22	3	0	0	—		22	3
Suwon	2017	K League Challenge	1	0	0	0	—		1	0
Suwon	Total		23	3	0	0	—		23	3
Chennaiyin	2017–18	Indian Super League	13	0	1	0	—		14	0
Career total			293	17	29	7	13	0	335	24

== Honours ==
Chennaiyin

- Indian Super League: 2017–18

Spain U16

- UEFA European Under-16 Championship: 2001

Spain U19

- UEFA European Under-19 Championship: 2004

Spain U20

- FIFA U-20 World Cup runner-up: 2003
