= Jude Nworuh =

Nigerian footballer (born 1989)

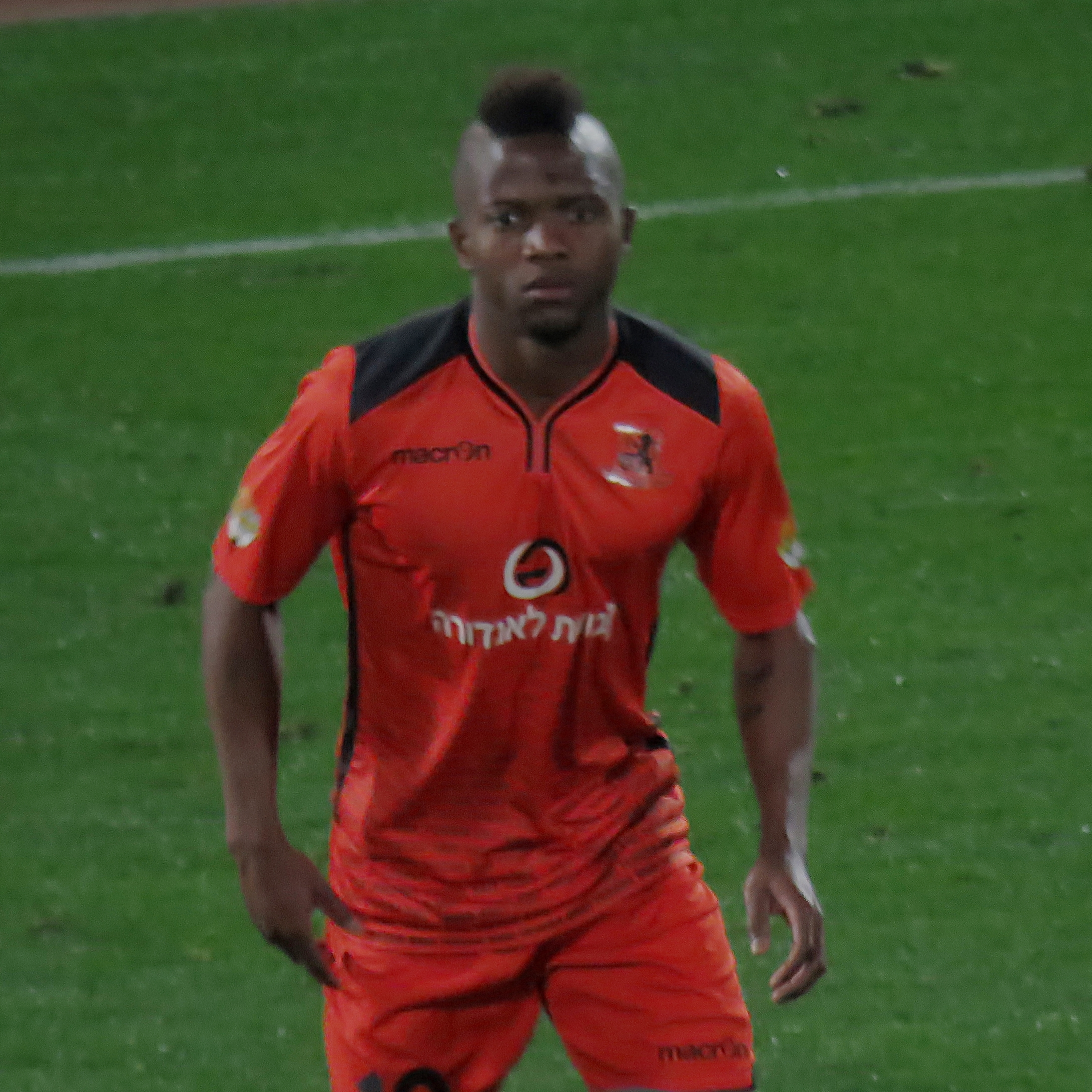
- Nworuh with Bnei Yehuda Tel Aviv in 2016

Personal information
- Full name: Jude Ikechukwu Nworuh
- Date of birth: 9 June 1989 (age 37)
- Place of birth: Lagos, Nigeria
- Height: 1.70 m (5 ft 7 in)
- Position: Forward

Youth career
- Ebedei
- 2007–2008: Midtjylland

Senior career*
Years	Team	Apps	(Gls)
2008–2012	Midtjylland	88	(17)
2010–2011	→ Fredericia (loan)	30	(14)
2012–2015	AC Horsens	72	(16)
2015–2016	Bnei Yehuda Tel Aviv	22	(7)
2016	Bnei Sakhnin	12	(1)
2017	Ilves	1	(0)
2017–2018	Chennaiyin FC	11	(0)
2019	Hapoel Marmorek	15	(4)
2019–2020	Hapoel Ramat Gan	10	(1)
- * Club domestic league appearances and goals as of 21:51, 1 December 2019 (UTC)

Jude Ikechukwu Nworuh (born 9 June 1989 in Lagos) is a Nigerian professional footballer.

== Career ==
Nworuh began his career at F.C. Ebedei in Lagos, Nigeria, which is the former youth team of Obafemi Martins and many other successful Nigerian footballers. He was a top scorer at F.C. Ebedei, which led to a move to the Danish Club, Midtjylland, who at the time were scouting heavily in Nigeria.

On 20 September 2008 he was injured during a match, resulting in a skull fracture. He was operated later that night in Aarhus, and made a full recovery.

He played his first UEFA Cup game in 2008, and featured again in the UEFA Europa League (name change) in 2011.

He was loaned out to Fredericia to get more playing time and then on 4 September 2012 he signed a contract with AC Horsens. He has been a consistent scorer for AC Horsens, and has been their highest goalscorer every season after his first season with them.

On 7 September 2017, after a stint with Finnish Veikkausliiga club Ilves, Nworuh signed with Indian Super League franchise Chennaiyin FC. He made 11 appearances, with his team winning the league. On 4 June 2018, it was announced that he was released by the club.

== Career statistics ==
As of 6 May 2025

Appearances and goals by club, season and competition
Club	Season	League			Domestic cups (Note: Includes Danish Cup, Israel State Cup and Indian Super Cup)		Continental		Total	
Club	Season	Division	Apps	Goals	Apps	Goals	Apps	Goals	Apps	Goals
Midtjylland	2007–08	Danish Superliga	5	2	1	0	0	0	6	2
Midtjylland	2008–09	Danish Superliga	22	5	0	0	3 (Note: Appearances in UEFA Cup)	2	25	7
Midtjylland	2009–10	Danish Superliga	13	0	1	0	0	0	14	0
Midtjylland	2010–11	Danish Superliga	0	0	0	0	0	0	0	0
Midtjylland	2011–12	Danish Superliga	29	5	1	0	4 (Note: Appearances in UEFA Europa League)	2	34	7
Midtjylland	2012–13	Danish Superliga	6	0	0	0	2	0	8	0
Midtjylland	Total		75	12	3	0	9	4	87	16
Fredericia (loan)	2010–11	Danish 1st Division	30	14	1	0	–		31	14
AC Horsens	2012–13	Danish Superliga	21	2	3	1	–		24	3
AC Horsens	2013–14	Danish 1st Division	26	10	4	3	–		30	13
AC Horsens	2014–15	Danish 1st Division	25	4	1	0	–		26	4
AC Horsens	Total		72	16	8	4	0	0	80	20
Bnei Yehuda Tel Aviv	2015–16	Israeli Premier League	22	7	3	0	–		25	7
Bnei Sakhnin	2016–17	Israeli Premier League	12	1	0	0	–		12	1
Ilves	2017	Veikkausliiga	1	0	0	0	–		1	0
Chennaiyin FC	2017–18	Indian Super League	10	0	1	0	–		11	0
Hapoel Marmorek	2018–19	Liga Leumit	15	4	0	0	–		15	4
Hapoel Ramat Gan	2019–20	Liga Leumit	10	1	1	0	–		11	1
Career total			247	55	17	4	9	4	273	63

== Honours ==
Chennaiyin FC

- Indian Super League: 2017–18
