= Karanjit Singh =

Indian footballer

Personal information
- Full name: Karanjit Singh Parmar
- Date of birth: 8 January 1986 (age 40)
- Place of birth: Hoshiarpur, Punjab, India
- Height: 1.86 m (6 ft 1 in)
- Position: Goalkeeper

Senior career*
Years	Team	Apps	(Gls)
2004–2010	JCT	120	(0)
2010–2015	Salgaocar	70	(0)
2015–2021	Chennaiyin	49	(0)
2016	→ Salgaocar (loan)	16	(0)
2017	→ Chennai City (loan)	12	(0)
2021–2024	Kerala Blasters	9	(0)
2024–2026	SC Delhi	1	(0)

International career^{‡}
2008–2010	India U23	8	(0)
2010–2015	India	17	(0)
Medal record
Representing India
SAFF Championship
Winner	2011 India
Runner-up	2013 Nepal
- * Club domestic league appearances and goals as of 24 December 2024 ‡ National team caps and goals as of 16 September 2019

Karanjit Singh Parmar (born 8 January 1986) is an Indian professional footballer who plays as a goalkeeper.

== Club career ==
Born in Hoshiarpur, Punjab, India, Karanjit started playing football at the age of 15. He was spotted at a local tournament by the former India national team head coach Sukhwinder Singh. Subsequently, he was called for JCT in 2004, where he spent six seasons. He moved to Salgaocar in 2010 and won the 2010–11 I-League in his debut season.

=== Chennaiyin ===
Karanjit was drafted by Indian Super League club Chennaiyin in 2015 ISL player auction. He appeared in four league games in the 2015 ISL but didn't managed to keep any clean sheets. Chennaiyin won their first ever ISL title with a 3–2 win against Goa in the final and Karanjit won his second league title. In January 2016, he was loaned out to Salgaocar for the 2015–16 I-League. He signed a two-year contract extension with Chennaiyin in July 2017 ahead of the 2017–18 ISL season. Karanjit kept seven clean sheets in 2017–18 ISL, a joint record for the season and Chennaiyin won their second ISL title and first Indian title with a 3–2 win against Bengaluru in the 2018 ISL final. On 31 August 2019, he signed a one-year contract extension which also made him a goalkeeping coach at the club. On 5 September 2020, Chennaiyin announced that Karanjit had signed a one-year contract extension which kept him at the club till the end of 2020–21 season.

=== Kerala Blasters ===
==== 2021–23 ====
On 21 December, it was announced that Kerala Blasters, the rivals of his old club Chennaiyin has signed Karanjit as a replacement for injured Albino Gomes.

Despite making no appearance for the Blasters in the 2021–22 season, Karanjit signed a one-year contract extension for the Blasters on 30 May 2022. He made his debut for the Blasters on 29 January 2023 keeping a cleansheet in a 2–0 win against NorthEast United FC, which was also his 50th ISL game.

==== 2023–24 ====
Ahead of 2023–24 season, on 16 June, the Blasters announced the one-year contract extension of Karanjit till 2024.

== International career ==
Karanjit made his debut for India against the United Arab Emirates on 23 July 2011 coming off the bench for red carded goalkeeper Subrata Pal. On 11 December 2011, he helped India win the 2011 SAFF Cup with a 4–0 victory of Afghanistan. He started all of India's five matches and kept three clean sheets while only conceding two goals throughout the tournament.

== Career statistics ==
=== Club ===
As of 9 January 2024

Club	Season	League			League Cup (Note: Includes Federation Cup and Super Cup)		Durand Cup		AFC		Other		Total	
Club	Season	Division	Apps	Goals	Apps	Goals	Apps	Goals	Apps	Goals	Apps	Goals	Apps	Goals
JCT	2004–05	NFL	0	0										
JCT	2005–06	NFL												
JCT	2006–07	NFL												
JCT	2007–08	I-League												
JCT	2008–09	I-League												
JCT	2009–10	I-League												
JCT	Total													
Salgaocar
Salgaocar	2010–11	I-League		0		0		0	–					
Salgaocar	2011–12	I-League	20	0	5	0	4	0	5	0	3 (Note: 1 appearances in Indian Super Cup and 2 appearances in Goa Professional League)	0	37	0
Salgaocar	2012–13	I-League	24	0	4	0	–		–		–		28	0
Salgaocar	2013–14	I-League	24	0	3	0	–		–		–		27	0
Salgaocar	2014–15	I-League	6	0	0	0	4	0	–		7 (Note: Appearance in Goa Professional League)	0	17	0
Salgaocar	Total		70	0	7	0	4	0	5	0	1	0	87	0
Chennaiyin	2015–16	Indian Super League	4	0	–		–		–		–		4	0
Chennaiyin	2016–17	Indian Super League	9	0	–		–		–		–		9	0
Chennaiyin	2017–18	Indian Super League	20	0	1	0	–		–		–		21	0
Chennaiyin	2018–19	Indian Super League	15	0	5	0	–		8	0	–		28	0
Chennaiyin	2019–20	Indian Super League	1	0	–		–		–		–		1	0
Chennaiyin	2020–21	Indian Super League	0	0	–		–		–		–		0	0
Chennaiyin	Total		49	0	6	0	0	0	8	0	0	0	63	0
Salgaocar (loan)	2016	I-League	16	0	2	0	–		–		–		18	0
Chennai City (loan)	2017	I-League	12	0	2	0	–		–		–		14	0
Kerala Blasters	2021–22	Indian Super League	0	0	–		–		–		–		0	0
Kerala Blasters	2022–23	Indian Super League	2	0	0	0	0	0	–		–		2	0
Kerala Blasters	2023–24	Indian Super League	0	0	0	0	0	0	–		–		0	0
Kerala Blasters	Total		2	0	0	0	0	0	0	0	0	0	2	0
Career Total														

=== International ===
Appearances and goals by national team and year
National team	Year	Apps	Goals
India
India	2011	9	0
India	2012	3	0
India	2013	3	0
India	2014	1	0
India	2015	1	0
Total		17	0

== Honours ==
Salgaocar

- I-League: 2010–11
- Federation Cup: 2011
- Indian Super Cup; runner-up: 2011
- Durand Cup: 2014

Chennaiyin

- Indian Super League: 2015, 2017–18
- Indian Super League; runner-up: 2019–20
- Super Cup; runner-up: 2019

Kerala Blasters

- Indian Super League; runner-up: 2021–22

India

- SAFF Championship: 2011, 2015; runner-up: 2013
- Nehru Cup: 2012
