= Fulganco Cardozo =

Indian footballer

Personal information
- Date of birth: 23 January 1988 (age 38)
- Place of birth: Goa, India
- Height: 1.83 m (6 ft 0 in)
- Position: Centre back

Team information
- Current team: Chennaiyin
- Number: 29

Youth career
- SESA FA

Senior career*
| Years | Team | Apps | (Gls) |
| 2007–2009 | Vasco | | |
| 2009–2010 | Sporting Goa | | |
| 2010–2013 | Salgaocar | 22 | (0) |
| 2014–2015 | Dempo | 12 | (0) |
| 2015 | Sporting Goa | 15 | (0) |
| 2016 | FC Goa | 5 | (1) |
| 2017 | Churchill Brothers | 1 | (0) |
| 2017–2018 | Chennaiyin | 1 | (0) |

International career^{‡}
| 2016 | India | 2 | (1) |
- * Club domestic league appearances and goals as of 6 June 2018 ‡ National team caps and goals as of 7 June 2016

Fulganco Cardozo (born 23 January 1988), sometimes incorrectly referred to as "Fulgencio Cardozo", is an Indian footballer who currently plays for Dempo in the I-League and India national football team as a centre back.

== International career ==
Carodozo made his debut for India when he was substituted for another debutant, Keegan Pereira, in the second half against Laos on 7 June 2016. He was 509th player to represent India. He scored his first goal for the India in the same match in 87th minute.

=== International statistics ===
As of 7 June 2016

| National team | Year | Apps | Goals |
|---|---|---|---|
| India | 2016 | 2 | 1 |

=== International goals ===
As of match played 7 June 2016. India score listed first, score column indicates score after each Cardozo goal.

International goals by date, venue, cap, opponent, score, result and competition
| No. | Date | Venue | Cap | Opponent | Score | Result | Competition |
|---|---|---|---|---|---|---|---|
| 1 | 7 June 2016 | Indira Gandhi Athletic Stadium, Guwahati, India | 1 | Laos | 6–1 | 6–1 | 2019 AFC Asian Cup qualification |

== Career statistics ==
=== Club ===
As of 30 May 2015

| Club | Season | League | | Federation Cup | | AFC | | Total | |
| Club | Season | Apps | Goals | Apps | Goals | Apps | Goals | Apps | Goals |
|---|---|---|---|---|---|---|---|---|---|
| Salgaocar | 2012–13 | 18 | 0 | 2 | 0 | – | – | 20 | 0 |
| Salgaocar | 2013–14 | 4 | 0 | 1 | 0 | – | – | 5 | 0 |
| Dempo | 2014–15 | 12 | 0 | 5 | 0 | – | – | 17 | 0 |
| Career total | | 34 | 0 | 8 | 0 | 0 | 0 | 42 | 0 |

== Honours ==
Chennaiyin

- Indian Super League: 2017–18
