= Rene Mihelič =

Slovenian footballer (born 1988)

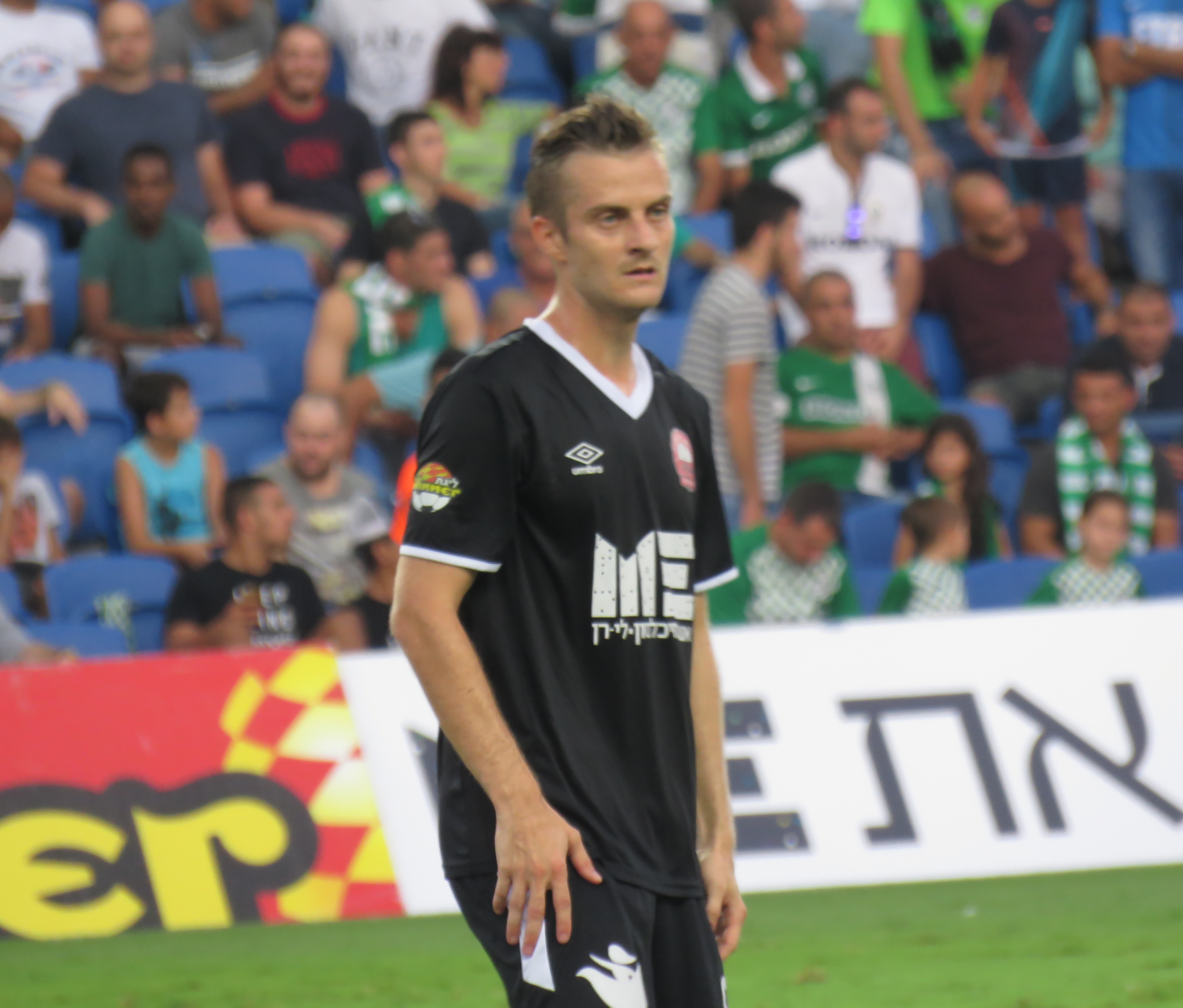
- Mihelič with Hapoel Ra'anana in 2015

Personal information
- Date of birth: 5 July 1988 (age 38)
- Place of birth: Maribor, SR Slovenia, SFR Yugoslavia
- Height: 1.77 m (5 ft 10 in)
- Position: Midfielder

Team information
- Current team: GSV St. Martin/Sulmtal

Youth career
- –2007: Maribor

Senior career*
Years	Team	Apps	(Gls)
2005–2010	Maribor	134	(19)
2010–2013	Nacional	35	(1)
2013	→ Levski Sofia (loan)	9	(1)
2013–2014	Zavrč	6	(1)
2014–2015	Debrecen	31	(4)
2015–2017	Hapoel Ra'anana	48	(4)
2017	Riga	5	(2)
2017–2018	Chennaiyin	14	(2)
2018–2019	Delhi Dynamos	16	(1)
2019	Persib Bandung	10	(0)
2020	Maribor	8	(0)
2021	Sutjeska Nikšić	13	(2)
2021–2023	SC Kalsdorf	53	(5)
2023–2025	USV Hengsberg	47	(18)
2025–	GSV St. Martin/Sulmtal	19	(1)

International career
2006	Slovenia U18	1	(0)
2006	Slovenia U19	3	(0)
2008–2010	Slovenia U20	8	(3)
2006–2010	Slovenia U21	20	(7)
2007	Slovenia	3	(0)
- * Club domestic league appearances and goals as of 7 July 2026

Rene Mihelič (born 5 July 1988) is a Slovenian professional footballer who plays as a midfielder for Austrian club GSV St. Martin/Sulmtal.

== Club career ==
Mihelič came through NK Maribor's youth academy, before making his senior team debut in September 2005. In 2010 he was signed by the Portuguese team Nacional.

On 8 February 2013, Bulgarian side Levski Sofia confirmed Mihelič had joined on loan until the end of the season, with the option of making the move permanent. He made his official A PFG debut for the club on 17 March 2013, after coming on as a substitute in the 0–0 home draw against Montana. Mihelič scored his first goal in his first appearance as a starter for Levski, netting the equalizer in the 1–1 away draw against Cherno More Varna on 30 March 2013.

Mihelič returned to Slovenia in October 2013, when he joined Zavrč.

On 25 January 2014, Mihelič was signed by Hungarian League club Debrecen. On 22 July 2014, Mihelič scored his first goal in the 2014–15 UEFA Champions League qualifying round against Cliftonville at the Nagyerdei Stadion.

On 27 July 2017, Mihelič joined Indian Super League franchise Chennaiyin FC on a free transfer after his contract with Latvian club Riga expired. He scored two goals in fourteen appearances and won the league title with his team. On 11 August 2018, he joined fellow league club Delhi Dynamos FC on a one-year deal.

== International career ==
Between 2006 and 2010, Mihelič represented Slovenia in all youth categories from under-18 to under-21. In August 2007, he made his debut for the senior team when he was 19 years, 1 month and 17 days old, which was a record for the youngest player ever to play for the national team at the time, before the record was broken by Petar Stojanović in 2014.

== Career statistics ==
=== Club ===
As of match played 2 June 2023

Appearances and goals by club, season and competition
Club	Season	League			National cup		League cup		Continental		Other		Total	
Club	Season	Division	Apps	Goals	Apps	Goals	Apps	Goals	Apps	Goals	Apps	Goals	Apps	Goals
Maribor	2005–06	PrvaLiga	16	1	4	0	—		—		—		20	1
Maribor	2006–07	PrvaLiga	29	6	4	1	—		7 (Note: Five appearances and three goals in UEFA Intertoto Cup, two appearances and one goal in UEFA Cup)	4	—		40	11
Maribor	2007–08	PrvaLiga	28	5	5	0	—		4 (Note: Appearance(s) in UEFA Intertoto Cup)	0	—		37	5
Maribor	2008–09	PrvaLiga	28	2	4	0	—		—		—		32	2
Maribor	2009–10	PrvaLiga	33	5	3	0	—		6 (Note: Four appearances and one goal in UEFA Champions League, two appearances in UEFA Europa League)	1	1 (Note: Appearance in Slovenian Supercup)	0	43	6
Maribor	Total		134	19	20	1	0	0	17	5	1	0	172	25
Nacional	2010–11	Primeira Liga	14	1	2	0	2	0	—		—		18	1
Nacional	2011–12	Primeira Liga	15	0	2	0	2	0	6 (Note: Appearance(s) in UEFA Europa League)	0	—		25	0
Nacional	2012–13	Primeira Liga	6	0	1	0	1	0	—		—		8	0
Nacional	Total		35	1	5	0	5	0	6	0	0	0	51	1
Levski Sofia	2012–13	A Group	9	1	3	0	—		—		—		12	1
Zavrč	2013–14	PrvaLiga	6	1	—		—		—		—		6	1
Debrecen	2013–14	Nemzeti Bajnokság I	13	3	3	0	—		0	0	—		16	3
Debrecen	2014–15	Nemzeti Bajnokság I	15	1	1	0	—		3 (Note: Appearance(s) in UEFA Champions League)	1	1 (Note: Appearance in Szuperkupa)	0	20	2
Debrecen	2015–16	Nemzeti Bajnokság I	3	0	0	0	—		3	1	—		6	1
Debrecen	Total		31	4	4	0	0	0	6	2	1	0	42	6
Hapoel Ra'anana	2015–16	Israeli Premier League	30	3	2	0	—		—		—		32	3
Hapoel Ra'anana	2016–17	Israeli Premier League	18	1	1	1	3	0	—		—		22	2
Hapoel Ra'anana	Total		48	4	3	1	3	0	0	0	0	0	54	5
Riga	2016	Virsliga	0	0	3	1	—		—		—		3	1
Riga	2017	Virsliga	5	2	0	0	—		—		—		5	2
Riga	Total		5	2	3	1	0	0	0	0	0	0	8	3
Chennaiyin FC	2017–18	Indian Super League	14	2	0	0	—		—		0	0	14	2
Delhi Dynamos	2018–19	Indian Super League	16	1	0	0	—		—		1 (Note: Appearance in Hero Super Cup)	0	17	1
Persib Bandung	2019	Liga 1	10	0	0	0	—		—		—		10	0
Maribor	2019–20	PrvaLiga	3	0	0	0	—		—		—		3	0
Maribor	2020–21	PrvaLiga	5	0	0	0	—		—		—		5	0
Maribor	Total		8	0	0	0	0	0	0	0	0	0	8	0
Sutjeska	2020–21	Montenegrin First League	13	2	—		—		—		—		13	2
SC Kalsdorf	2021–22	Regionalliga Central	28	3	2	1	—		—		—		30	4
SC Kalsdorf	2022–23	Regionalliga Central	25	2	0	0	—		—		—		25	2
SC Kalsdorf	Total		53	5	2	1	0	0	0	0	0	0	55	6
Career total			382	42	40	4	8	0	29	7	3	0	462	53

== Honours ==
Maribor

- Slovenian PrvaLiga: 2008–09
- Slovenian Cup: 2009–10
- Slovenian Supercup: 2009

Debrecen

- Hungarian League: 2013–14

Chennaiyin FC

- Indian Super League: 2017–18
