= Sinivasan Pandiyan =

Indian footballer

Personal information
- Full name: Sinivasan Pandiyan
- Date of birth: 6 December 1995 (age 30)
- Place of birth: Thanjavur, Tamil Nadu, India
- Position: Central midfielder

Team information
- Current team: Gokulam Kerala

Youth career
- Noble Football Academy

Senior career*
Years	Team	Apps	(Gls)
2015–2016	Indian Bank RC		
2016–2017	Viva Chennai		
2017–2018	Chennai City	17	(0)
2018	Chennaiyin	0	(0)
2019–2020	Chennaiyin	1	(0)
2021–	Gokulam Kerala	0	(0)
- * Club domestic league appearances and goals as of 12:08, 4 January 2019 (UTC)

Sinivasan Pandiyan (born 6 December 1995) is an Indian professional footballer who plays as a central midfielder for Gokulam Kerala in I-League.

== Career ==
Born in Thanjavur, Tamil Nadu, Pandiyan began his career with the Noble Football Academy in Karaikudi. While with the academy, he was coached by former India international Raman Vijayan. Pandiyan stayed at the academy until after high school. He moved back to Chennai to play for Indian Bank in the CFA Senior Division before also playing for Viva Chennai.

=== Chennai City ===
In June 2017, it was announced that Pandiyan was signed by Chennai City for the I-League. He made his professional debut for the club on 4 December 2017 in Chennai City's second match of the 2017–18 season against Gokulam Kerala. Pandiyan started and played the whole match as Chennai City drew 1–1. By the end of the season, Pandiyan had played in 17 matches for Chennai City, starting 16, while playing a pivotal role for the club from midfield and forming a partnership with Michael Soosairaj.

According to Pandiyan, he initially struggled to adapt to playing in the I-League before becoming comfortable. "It was difficult at first because it was a new level altogether. I couldn’t play that well but I started to improve my game as the season went by. I adjusted to the I-League level soon and I’m very happy that I could play at such a level," he said at the end of the season.

=== Chennaiyin ===
After his breakout season with Chennai City, Pandiyan signed a three-year contract with local Indian Super League side Chennaiyin on 13 April 2018.

== Career statistics ==
As of 31 January 2021

Club	Season	League			Cup		Continental		Total	
Club	Season	Division	Apps	Goals	Apps	Goals	Apps	Goals	Apps	Goals
Chennai City	2017–18	I-League	17	0	1	0	—	—	18	0
Chennai City	2018–19	I-League	6	0	0	0	0	0	6	0
Career total			23	0	1	0	0	0	24	0

== Honours ==
Chennai City

- I-League: 2018–19
