= Jerry Lalrinzuala =

Indian footballer (born 1998)

Personal information
- Date of birth: 30 July 1998 (age 28)
- Place of birth: Mizoram, India
- Height: 1.67 m (5 ft 5 1/2 in)
- Position: Left-back

Team information
- Current team: Goa
- Number: 18

Youth career
- Bethlehem Vengthlang
- 2012–2016: AIFF Elite Academy

Senior career*
Years	Team	Apps	(Gls)
2016–2022	Chennaiyin	94	(1)
2016–2017	→ DSK Shivajians (loan)	18	(0)
2022–2023	East Bengal	19	(0)
2023–2025	Odisha	42	(0)
2025–	Goa	0	(0)

International career^{‡}
2013	India U17	8	(2)
2015	India U20	4	(0)
2017–2018	India U23	5	(1)
2017–2019	India	9	(0)
- * Club domestic league appearances and goals as of 21:33, 23 February 2025 (UTC) ‡ National team caps and goals as of 17:00, 16 July 2019 (UTC)

Jerry Lalrinzuala (born 30 July 1998) is an Indian professional footballer who plays as a defender for Indian Super League club Goa.

== Early life ==
Born in Mizoram, Lalrinzuala started playing football from the age of five. His father – a police officer who played for army football teams – and his mother did not want him to get into football and wanted Lalrinzuala to go to college. "I took to the game when I was five. But my parents did not like me playing. They wanted me to study," said Lalrinzuala. He would attempt to attend football trials behind his parents back but was caught once by his father.

== Club career ==
Lalrinzuala was a part of the AIFF Elite Academy and Bethlehem Vengthlang of the Mizoram Premier League before signing with Chennaiyin of the Indian Super League. He joined the AIFF Elite Academy in 2012. In early 2016, Lalrinzuala was one of five young footballers to be sponsored on their training stint with Metz in France.

=== Chennaiyin ===
After impressing Chennaiyin's first-team staff in pre-season, he was included in the squad for the season. He made his professional debut for the team on 2 October 2016 in their opening match against Atlético de Kolkata. He came on as a 73rd-minute substitute for Nallappan Mohanraj as Chennaiyin drew the match 2–2.

On 13 October 2016, in only his third appearance of his career, Lalrinzuala was awarded the "Emerging Player of the Match" award after Chennaiyin's 2–0 victory over Goa. Lalrinzuala then earned the first assist of his career on 23 October against Pune City. His long-ball to Jeje Lalpekhlua was lobbed into the net by the India international as Chennaiyin went on to draw the match 1–1. He was then awarded his second "Emerging Player of the Match" award in the next match against Kerala Blasters. Chennaiyin drew that match 0–0 as Lalrinzuala ended his first month as a professional playing six matches and starting four of them.

On 1 December 2016, after a rocky November, Lalrinzuala ended his first professional season with Chennaiyin by scoring his first professional goal from a free-kick in the 4th minute of their match against Goa. The goal gave Chennaiyin a 1–0 lead, which ended with Chennaiyin losing 5–4. Despite the defeat, Lalrinzuala was still praised for his performance and also earned his fourth Emerging Player of the Match award for the season.

At the end of the season, Lalrinzuala was given plenty of praise for his performances with Chennaiyin. Chennaiyin assistant coach Syed Sabir Pasha stated "Jerry is a boy with natural talent. I know him from a very long time and knew about his quality. He impressed Marco from the very first day of training. He has a great left foot and is very comfortable on the ball. He has improved his defending but most importantly he is a humble boy with great character. Even when he makes mistakes, he is not scared to continue playing his game. This is a very important attribute to have. He has a very bright future."

The accolades continued to come in for Lalrinzuala as he was awarded the ISL Emerging Player of the Season award after the ISL final on 18 December.

==== DSK Shivajians (loan) ====
On 20 December 2016, after his debut season with Chennaiyin, Lalrinzuala was loaned to DSK Shivajians for the I-League season. He made his debut for the side in their opening fixture of the season on 8 January 2017 against Mumbai at the Cooperage Ground. He came on as a 62nd-minute substitute for Saša Kolunija as DSK Shivajians fell 1–0.

At the end of the I-League season, after playing 18 matches for DSK Shivajians, Lalrinzuala earned the Best Emerging Player of I-League award. On 8 May 2017, Lalrinzuala made his Federation Cup debut for DSK Shivajians, starting in a 4–0 defeat against Mohun Bagan. DSK Shivajians soon exited the tournament at the group stage and thus Lalrinzuala's loan with the club ended.

==== 2017–18 season ====
On 19 July 2017, it was announced that Lalrinzuala had been retained by Chennaiyin for the 2017–18 season as a capped under-21 player. He started during the team's first match of the season against Goa. He started at left-back for Chennaiyin as they were defeated 3–2. Despite the defeat, Lalrinzuala earned the ISL Emerging Player award for his performance against Goa. Lalrinzuala once again won the ISL Emerging Player award after Chennaiyin's very next match against NorthEast United.

Throughout the first month of the season, Lalrinzuala formed a formidable partnership with fellow defenders, Ignacio Calderón, Maílson Alves, and Henrique Sereno, keeping two cleansheets from their first three matches. He continued his good start to the season on 3 December 2017 when Chennaiyin took on Pune City. He started the match and helped Chennaiyin to keep a clean sheet as they won 1–0. He also earned the Hero of the Match award for his performance, his first time earning the Indian Super League top match award.

At the end of the regular season, after Lalrinzuala had played in 17 of his side's 18 matches, Chennaiyin finished in second and thus qualified for a spot in the ISL playoffs. He proceeded to start in both legs of Chennaiyin's semi-final match ups against Goa. Chennaiyin won the tie 4–1 to enter into their second ever Indian Super League final. During the final, Lalrinzuala started and helped his side secure a 3–2 victory over Bengaluru at the Sree Kanteerava Stadium. After his performance in the final, Lalrinzuala earned the Emerging Player of the Match award as he won his first piece of silverware in his career.

==== 2019–20 season ====
Jerry stayed at the Marina Arena for his 4th season. He was on the sidelines for the first half season after getting criticism for being very error-prone. He earned his left-back spot back after Owen Coyle was appointed the new manager of the side, and played a crucial role in the team as Chennaiyin made a late resurgence and qualified for the playoffs on the final day. He got 2 assists in the semi-final first leg against FC Goa, whom Chennai managed to win 4–1 at home against all the odds. However, he was unable to win the ISL trophy, as his side were beaten 3–1 by ATK in the final.

== International career ==
Lalrinzuala has been a part of the India national youth set-up since joining the AIFF Academies. His first bit of international exposure came in October 2012 as part of the AIFF Regional Academy based in Kolkata. In July 2013 he was made part of the India U16 side that would participate in the 2013 SAFF U-16 Championship alongside future Chennaiyin FC teammate Anirudh Thapa. On 30 July 2013, during the final against hosts Nepal, Lalrinzuala scored the only goal of the match from 35-yards out to earn India the championship.

After leading India's triumph at the SAFF U-16 Championship, Lalrinzuala was included in the India U16 side for the 2014 AFC U-16 Championship qualifiers. Despite a good start during the qualifiers, including two victories and a draw in their opening three matches, defeat to Kuwait 2–1 in the final match meant that India failed to qualify for the tournament proper.

Almost two years later, in August 2015, Lalrinzuala was called up into the India U19 squad that would participate in the inaugural SAFF U-20 Championship. Despite helping the side reach the final against Nepal, India could not win the championship as they fell 5–4 on penalties.

In February 2017, after his performances for both Chennaiyin in the Indian Super League and DSK Shivajians in the I-League, India head coach Stephen Constantine called Lalrinzuala up to the senior team. He would be part of the 31 player preparatory camp that would be preparing for India's first AFC Asian Cup qualifier against Myanmar and their friendly against Cambodia. After the camp, it was announced that Lalrinzuala had made the final 24 man squad for those two matches. Despite being included in the squad for both matches though, he did not see any playing time in either game.

Lalrinzuala was given his senior international debut by Constantine on 6 June 2017 when India took on Nepal in a friendly at the Mumbai Football Arena. He came on as a 64th-minute substitute for Narayan Das as India won 2–0.

== Career statistics ==
=== Club ===
As of 25 February 2023

Club	Season	League			Cup		AFC		Total	
Club	Season	Division	Apps	Goals	Apps	Goals	Apps	Goals	Apps	Goals
Chennaiyin	2016	Indian Super League	13	1	0	0	—		13	1
Chennaiyin	2017–18	Indian Super League	20	0	1 (Note: Appearance(s) in Super Cup)	0	—		21	0
Chennaiyin	2018–19	Indian Super League	10	0	3	0	5 (Note: Appearance(s) in AFC Cup)	0	18	0
Chennaiyin	2019–20	Indian Super League	14	0	0	0	—		14	0
Chennaiyin	2020–21	Indian Super League	19	0	0	0	—		19	0
Chennaiyin	2021–22	Indian Super League	18	0	0	0	—		18	0
Chennaiyin	Total		94	1	4	0	5	0	103	1
DSK Shivajians (loan)	2016–17	I-League	18	0	1 (Note: Appearance(s) in Federation Cup)	0	—		19	0
East Bengal	2022–23	Indian Super League	19	0	3 (Note: Appearance(s) in Durand Cup)	0	—		22	0
Odisha	2023–24	Indian Super League	20	0	5	0	—		0	0
Career total			131	1	8	0	5	0	144	1

=== International ===
As of 16 July 2019.

National Team	Year	Friendlies		Qualifiers		Competition		Total	
National Team	Year	Apps	Goals	Apps	Goals	Apps	Goals	Apps	Goals
India	2017	2	0	1	0	—		3	0
India	2018	2	0	1	0	1	0	2	0
India	2019	2	0	0	0	—		1	0
Total		6	0	2	0	1	0	9	0

== Honours ==
Chennaiyin

- Indian Super League: 2017–18

India

- SAFF Championship runner-up: 2018
- Tri-Nation Series: 2017
- Intercontinental Cup: 2018

Individual

- Indian Super League Emerging Player of the Year: 2016
- Best Emerging Player of Hero I-League: 2016–17
