= Germanpreet Singh =

Indian footballer

Personal information
- Date of birth: 24 June 1996 (age 30)
- Place of birth: Gurdaspur, Punjab, India
- Height: 1.75 m (5 ft 9 in)
- Position: Midfielder

Team information
- Current team: Jamshedpur
- Number: 6

Youth career
- AIFF Academy

Senior career*
Years	Team	Apps	(Gls)
2015–2017	Dempo	14	(1)
2017-2018	Minerva Punjab	11	(0)
2018–2022	Chennaiyin	55	(1)
2022–	Jamshedpur	8	(0)

International career^{‡}
2013	India U19	4	(0)
2015–2016	India U23	11	(1)
2016–2019	India	8	(0)
- * Club domestic league appearances and goals as of 22:11, 31 January 2024 (UTC) ‡ National team caps and goals as of 7 January 2019

Germanpreet Singh (born 24 June 1996) is an Indian professional footballer who plays as a midfielder for Indian Super League club Jamshedpur.

== Career ==
Born in Gurdaspur, Punjab, Singh is a graduate of the AIFF Academy. He signed for Dempo of the I-League and made his professional debut on 27 January 2015 against Sporting Goa. He came on as a 5th-minute substitute for Peter Carvalho as Dempo won 3–0. He scored his first ever professional goal in his next match on 7 February 2015 against Royal Wahingdoh. After coming off the bench at half-time, Singh scored what would be the opening goal of the game for Dempo but the match still ended 1–1.

=== Chennaiyin ===
In 2017, Germanpreet signed from Minerva Punjab on a 3-year deal. He only made a single appearance in his first season. On 30 September 2018, he was included in the game squad for the opening match. He made a total of 11 appearances for his team before the AFC Asian Cup Break.

== International ==
Germanpreet represented the India U19 side during the 2014 AFC U-19 Championship qualifiers in 2013. He was also selected into the preliminary squad for the India U23 side for the 2014 Asian Games.

Germanpreet made his Indian U23 debut against Uzbekistan U23 on 27 March 2015 in a 2016 AFC U-23 qualifier in the Bangabandhu National Stadium in Bangladesh.

In August 2016, he made his debut for his national team as a substitute in a game against Thailand, that India won by 4–1.

== Career statistics ==
=== Club ===
As of 31 January 2024

Club	Season	League			Cup		AFC		Total	
Club	Season	Division	Apps	Goals	Apps	Goals	Apps	Goals	Apps	Goals
Dempo	2014–15	I-League	4	1	0	0	—		4	1
Dempo	2015–16	I-League 2nd Division	10	0	0	0	—		10	0
Dempo	Chennaiyin total		14	1	0	0	0	0	14	1
Minerva Punjab	2016–17	I-League	11	0	3 (Note: Appearance(s) in Federation Cup)	0	—		14	0
Chennaiyin	2017–18	Indian Super League	7	0	0	0	—		7	0
Chennaiyin	2018–19	Indian Super League	9	0	1 (Note: Appearance(s) in Super Cup)	0	6 (Note: Appearance(s) in AFC Cup)	0	16	0
Chennaiyin	2019–20	Indian Super League	13	0	4	0	—		17	0
Chennaiyin	2020–21	Indian Super League	11	0	0	0	—		11	0
Chennaiyin	2021–22	Indian Super League	15	1	0	0	—		15	1
Chennaiyin	Chennaiyin total		55	1	5	0	6	0	66	1
Jamshedpur	2022–23	Indian Super League	5	0	1	0	—		6	0
Jamshedpur	2023–24	Indian Super League	3	0	4	0	—		7	0
Jamshedpur	Total		8	0	5	0	0	0	13	0
Career total			88	2	13	0	6	0	107	2

== Honours ==
Chennaiyin

- Indian Super League: 2017–18

India

- SAFF Championship runner-up: 2018

India U23

- South Asian Games Silver medal: 2016
