= Francis Fernandes =

Indian footballer

Personal information
- Full name: Francisco Fernandes
- Date of birth: 25 November 1985 (age 40)
- Place of birth: Vasco da Gama, Goa, India
- Height: 1.72 m (5 ft 7 1/2 in)
- Position: Right winger

Youth career
- Vasco

Senior career*
Years	Team	Apps	(Gls)
2004–2006	Vasco	?	(?)
2006–2014	Salgaocar	85	(15)
2014–2016	Delhi Dynamos	16	(0)
2015	→ Dempo (loan)	20	(1)
2016	Pune City	4	(0)
2017–2019	Chennaiyin	30	(1)

International career^{‡}
2014	India U23		
2011–	India	31	(1)
- * Club domestic league appearances and goals as of 13:40, 16 December 2018 (UTC) ‡ National team caps and goals as of 13 November 2015

Francisco Fernandes (born 25 November 1985), also known as Francis Fernandes, is an Indian professional footballer playing primarily as a winger for Dempo S.C. in the Goa Professional League.

== Club career ==
Fernandes spent his childhood in Bogmalo, near to the tourist hotspot of Bogmalo Beach. It was there that he learnt his first lessons in football. He played for his school, Regina Mundi, and later, while at MES college, he gave trials for Vasco and got selected for Vasco U-19. After two successful seasons with the Vasco S.C. senior team, he joined Salgaocar in 2006.

== International career ==
Fernandes scored his first international goal in a 3–2 loss to Palestine on 6 October 2014.

=== International statistics ===
As of 14 March 2015

India national team
Year	Apps	Goals
2011	2	0
2012	11	0
2013	11	0
2014	2	1
2015	5	0
Total	31	1

==== International goals ====
India score listed first, score column indicates score after each Fernandes goal.

International goals by date, venue, cap, opponent, score, result and competition
No.	Date	Venue	Opponent	Score	Result	Competition
1	6 October 2014	Kanchenjunga Stadium, Siliguri, India	Palestine	2–3	2–3	Friendly

== Honours ==
India

- SAFF Championship runner-up: 2013
- Nehru Cup: 2012

Chennaiyin FC

- Indian Super League: 2017–18
