= Gregory Nelson =

Dutch footballer

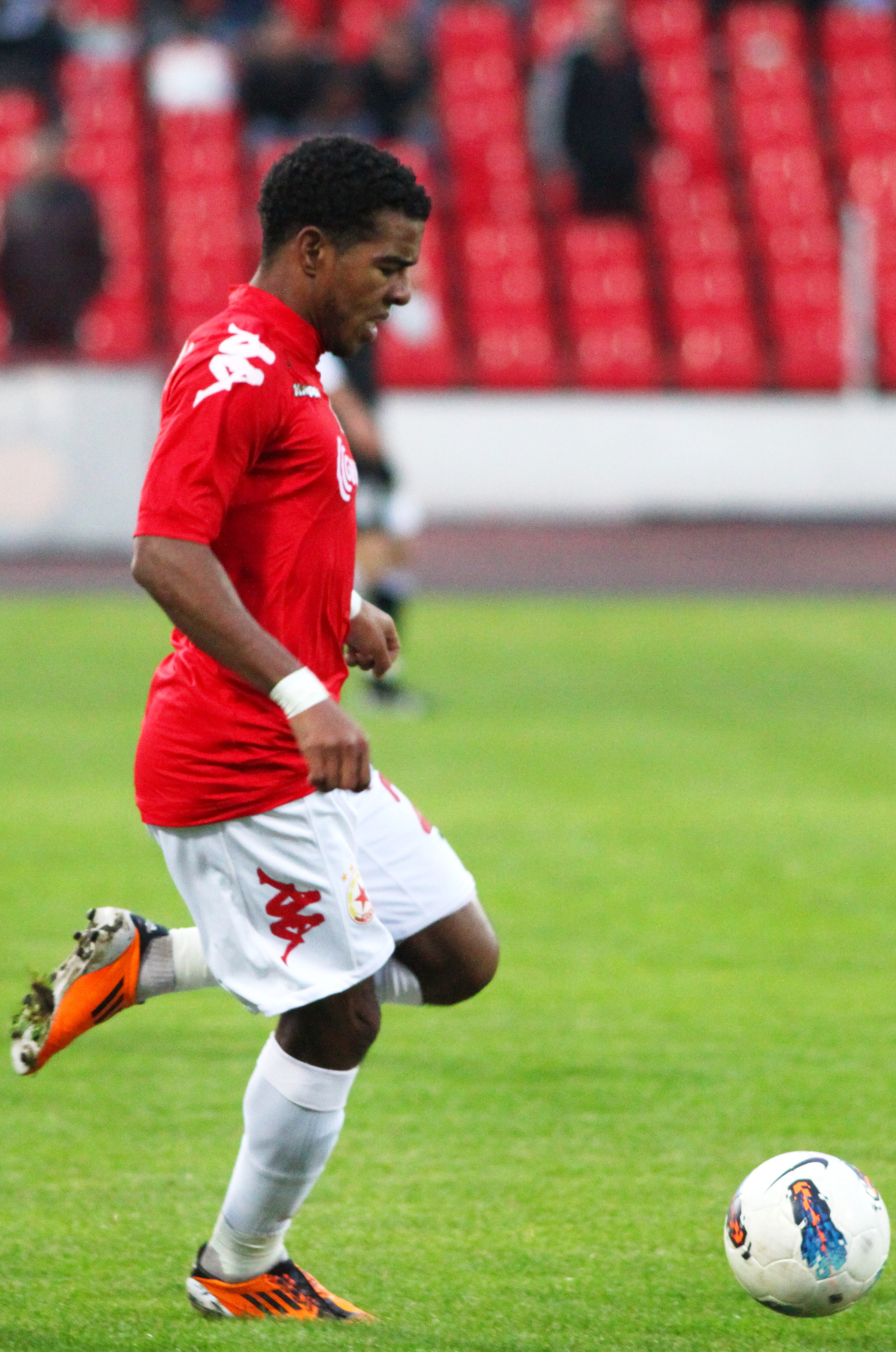

Personal information
- Date of birth: 31 January 1988 (age 38)
- Place of birth: Amsterdam, Netherlands
- Height: 1.76 m (5 ft 9 in)
- Position: Winger

Youth career
- AZ

Senior career*
Years	Team	Apps	(Gls)
2007–2009	AZ	0	(0)
2009	→ RBC (loan)	15	(0)
2009–2010	RBC	16	(5)
2010–2012	CSKA Sofia	37	(5)
2012–2015	Metalurh Donetsk	81	(6)
2015–2016	Botev Plovdiv	15	(4)
2017	Kaisar	0	(0)
2017	Al-Muharraq		
2017–2019	Chennaiyin FC	33	(3)
- * Club domestic league appearances and goals

Gregory Nelson (born 31 January 1988) is a Dutch former professional footballer who played as a winger.

== Early and personal life ==
Born in Amsterdam, Nelson is of Surinamese descent.

== Club career ==
Nelson began his career with AZ and RBC, playing for the latter after a loan deal was made permanent.

After being released by RBC following their bankruptcy, he was without a club until he signed for Bulgarian club CSKA Sofia in June 2010.

In January 2012, he signed for Ukrainian club Metalurh Donetsk on a three-and-a-half-year contract. During his time in Ukraine, a war with Russia began, and the club had to relocate to Kyiv for safety.

In October 2015, after Metalurh Donetsk went bankrupt, he returned to Bulgaria to sign for Botev Plovdiv. On 23 October 2015, on his debut for the club, Nelson scored the winning goal against Pirin Blagoevgrad.

In January 2017 he signed for Kazakhstan Premier League side FC Kaisar. After his contract was terminated shortly afterwards for personal reasons, he joined Bahraini Premier League side Al-Muharraq.

After his contract with Al-Muharraq expired, in September 2017 he signed for Chennaiyin FC in the Indian Super League. He left the club in April 2019.

== International career ==
In June 2011, Nelson expressed interest in representing Suriname at international level.

== Honours ==
Chennaiyin FC

- Indian Super League: 2017–18
