= Dhanpal Ganesh =

Indian footballer (born 1994)

Personal information
- Date of birth: 13 June 1994 (age 32)
- Place of birth: Chennai, Tamil Nadu, India
- Height: 1.85 m (6 ft 1 in)
- Position: Defensive midfielder

Team information
- Current team: Chennaiyin
- Number: 17

Youth career
- Pune

Senior career*
| Years | Team | Apps | (Gls) |
| 2011–2016 | Pune | 30 | (0) |
| 2012–2013 | → Pailan Arrows (loan) | 18 | (0) |
| 2015 | → Chennaiyin (loan) | 0 | (0) |
| 2016− | Chennaiyin | 28 | (2) |
| 2017 | → Chennai City (loan) | 17 | (1) |

International career^{‡}
| 2012 | India U23 | 3 | (0) |
| 2015– | India | 5 | (0) |
- * Club domestic league appearances and goals as of 12:03, 14 December 2020 (UTC) ‡ National team caps and goals as of 11 August 2017

Dhanpal Ganesh (born 13 June 1994) is an Indian professional footballer who plays as a midfielder for Chennaiyin in the Indian Super League. He has also played for the India national team.

== Career ==
=== Pune ===
Born in Chennai, Tamil Nadu, Ganesh became the first player from the Pune Academy to sign with the first team at Pune in July 2011. He made his professional debut for the club on 18 December 2011 against Churchill Brothers at the Fatorda Stadium; he came on in the 94th minute for Othallo Tabia as Pune won the match 2–0. He made his first start for the club in the I-League on 18 April 2012 against Salgaocar in a 2–0 win.

==== Pailan Arrows (loan) ====
For the 2012–13 I-League season, Ganesh was loaned out to the Pailan Arrows for the whole season. He made his debut for the Arrows on 28 August 2012 in the Durand Cup against Air India, in which he started as Arrows drew the match 1–1. He then made his league debut for Pailan Arrows on the league opening day against Mumbai on 6 October 2013. He came on as an 87th-minute substitute for Holicharan Narzary as the Arrows won the match 3–2.

=== Return to Pune ===
After a season with the Arrows, Dhanpal returned to Pune for the 2013-14 season. He made 12 appearances in the league and featured regularly in the starting line-up in the second half of the season. He maintained his form and made his debut in the AFC Champions League in a qualifier against Hanoi T&T in a 0–3 loss. Dhanpal scored his first senior goal for Pune in the opening game of Pune's 2014 Durand Cup campaign in a 3–0 win over Churchill Brothers. He started in the first ever Pune Derby against Bharat FC but was sent off following an off-the-ball challenge in the 88th minute of the game, which ended 1-1.

=== Chennaiyin ===
In July 2015, Ganesh was drafted to play for Chennaiyin in the 2015 Indian Super League.

== International ==
On 20 June 2012 it was confirmed that Ganesh would play for the India U23 team during 2013 AFC U-22 Asian Cup qualification. He made his debut for the under-23 team on 23 June 2012 against Lebanon U23 in the 2013 AFC U-23 Asian Cup qualifiers in which India won 5–2. He made his senior debut on 17 March 2015 against Nepal, coming on as a substitute for Eugeneson Lyngdoh.

== Career statistics ==
As of 27 March 2020

| Club | Season | League | | | Federation Cup/Super Cup | | Durand Cup | | AFC | | Total | |
| Club | Season | Division | Apps | Goals | Apps | Goals | Apps | Goals | Apps | Goals | Apps | Goals |
|---|---|---|---|---|---|---|---|---|---|---|---|---|
| Pune | 2011–12 | I-League | 2 | 0 | 0 | 0 | 0 | 0 | — | — | 2 | 0 |
| Pune | 2013–14 | I-League | 12 | 0 | 2 | 0 | 0 | 0 | 4 | 0 | 18 | 0 |
| Pune | 2014–15 | I-League | 16 | 0 | 4 | 0 | 4 | 1 | — | — | 24 | 1 |
| Pune total | | | 30 | 0 | 6 | 0 | 4 | 1 | 4 | 0 | 44 | 1 |
| Pailan Arrows (loan) | 2012–13 | I-League | 18 | 0 | 2 | 1 | 1 | 0 | — | — | 21 | 1 |
| Chennaiyin (loan) | 2015 | Indian Super League | 0 | 0 | — | — | — | — | — | — | 0 | 0 |
| Chennaiyin | 2016 | Indian Super League | 0 | 0 | — | — | — | — | — | — | 0 | 0 |
| Chennaiyin | 2017–18 | Indian Super League | 17 | 2 | 1 | 0 | — | — | — | — | 18 | 2 |
| Chennaiyin | 2018–19 | Indian Super League | 0 | 0 | 0 | 0 | — | — | 6 | 0 | 6 | 0 |
| Chennaiyin | 2019–20 | Indian Super League | 5 | 0 | 0 | 0 | — | — | — | — | 5 | 0 |
| Chennaiyin total | | | 22 | 2 | 1 | 0 | 0 | 0 | 6 | 0 | 29 | 2 |
| Chennai City (loan) | 2016–17 | I-League | 17 | 1 | 3 | 1 | — | — | — | — | 20 | 2 |
| Career total | | | 87 | 3 | 12 | 2 | 5 | 1 | 6 | 0 | 110 | 6 |

== Honours ==
=== Club ===
Chennaiyin

- Indian Super League: 2015 Champions
- Indian Super League: 2017–18 Champions
