= 2024–25 Chennaiyin FC season =

2024–25 season of Chennaiyin FC

Chennaiyin
2024–25 season
- Owner: Abhishek Bachchan; MS Dhoni; Vita Dani
- Head Coach: Owen Coyle
- Stadium: Jawaharlal Nehru Stadium
Home colours	Away colours

The 2024–25 Chennaiyin season is the club's Eleventh season since its establishment in 2014 as well as their Eleventh season in 2024–25 Indian Super League.In addition to the league, they will also compete in the 2024 Durand Cup and Indian Super Cup.

== Management team ==
Position	Name
Head coach	(Scotland) Owen Coyle
Assistant coach	(Scotland) Sandy Stewart
Assistant coach	(India) Noel Wilson
Goalkeeping coach	(India) Rajat Ghosh Dastidar

== Players ==
=== Squad information ===
As of 1 May 2025

Notes:

- Flags indicate national team as defined under FIFA eligibility rules. Players may hold more than one non-FIFA nationality.
- All players in this Squad were part of Indian Super League
- Chennaiyin FC went on to play with Reserve team with a mix of few senior team players for the Durand Cup
- Chennaiyin FC Squad for Super Cup included only 24 players among this original Squad
- * denotes a player who left on Winter transfer window.
- * denotes a player who joined on Winter transfer window.

No.	Name	Nationality	Position(s)	Date of Birth (Age)	Signed From
Goalkeepers
1	Samik Mitra	(India)	GK	1 December 2000 (age 25)	(India) Indian Arrows
13	Mohammad Nawaz	(India)	GK	21 January 2000 (age 26)	(India) Mumbai City FC
24	Mohanraj K	(India)	GK	26 April 2004 (age 22)	(India) Chennaiyin FC II
31	Malhar Mohol	(India)	GK	10 June 2005 (age 20)	(India) Chennaiyin FC II
Defenders
3	Ryan Edwards	(England)	CB	7 October 1993 (age 32)	(Scotland) Dundee United
4	Laldinpuia	(India)	CB/RB	29 November 1996 (age 29)	(India) Jamshedpur FC
5	Elsinho	(Brazil)	CB/DM	10 April 1991 (age 35)	(India) Jamshedpur FC
6	Ankit Mukherjee	(India)	RB/CB	10 June 1996 (age 29)	(India) East Bengal FC
17	Mandar Rao Dessai	(India)	LB	18 March 1992 (age 34)	(India) East Bengal FC
20	Pritam Kotal	(India)	CB/RB	8 September 1993 (age 32)	(India) Kerala Blasters FC
23	Vignesh Dakshinamurthy	(India)	LB	5 March 1998 (age 28)	(India) Hyderabad FC
26	Laldinliana Renthlei	(India)	RB	26 August 1998 (age 27)	(India) Jamshedpur FC
32	Karthick Thirumalai	(India)	DF	21 August 2005 (age 20)	(India) Chennaiyin FC II
33	Bikash Yumnam	(India)	CB	2 January 2006 (age 20)	(India) Punjab FC
40	Praful Kumar YV	(India)	CB	10 June 2003 (age 22)	(India) Chennaiyin FC II
Midfielders
8	Jitendra Singh	(India)	DM/CM/CB	13 June 2001 (age 24)	(India) Jamshedpur FC
10	Connor Shields	(Scotland)	AM/CM/DM	29 July 1997 (age 28)	(Scotland) Motherwell FC
21	Maheson Singh Tongbram	(India)	DM	26 November 2004 (age 21)	(India) Punjab FC
22	Lalrinliana Hnamte	(India)	CM/DM/RM	29 April 2003 (age 23)	(India) Mohun Bagan Super Giant
37	Jiteshwor Singh	(India)	DM/CM	10 December 2001 (age 24)	(India) NEROCA FC
55	Ngangom Raman Singh	(India)	MF	27 March 2007 (age 19)	(India) Chennaiyin FC II
70	Lukas Brambilla	(Brazil)	AM/LW/RW	4 January 1995 (age 31)	(Cyprus) Othellos Athienou FC
88	Edwin Sydney Vanspaul	(India)	DM/RB	24 September 1992 (age 33)	(India) East Bengal FC
Forwards
7	Kiyan Nassiri	(India)	CF/LW/RW	17 November 2000 (age 25)	(India) Mohun Bagan Super Giant
9	Wilmar Jordán	(Colombia)	CF	17 October 1990 (age 35)	(India) Punjab FC
19	Irfan Yadwad	(India)	CF/LW	19 June 2001 (age 24)	(India) FC Bengaluru United
27	Daniel Chima Chukwu	(Nigeria)	CF	4 January 1991 (age 35)	(India) Jamshedpur FC
36	Vivek S	(India)	FW	27 February 2005 (age 21)	(India) Chennaiyin FC II
39	Vishal R	(India)	FW	28 August 2004 (age 21)	(India) Chennaiyin FC II
47	Vincy Barretto	(India)	LW/RW	8 December 1999 (age 26)	(India) Kerala Blasters FC
71	Farukh Choudhary	(India)	LW/RW	8 November 1996 (age 29)	(India) Jamshedpur FC
77	Gurkirat Singh	(India)	RW/CF/LW	16 July 2003 (age 22)	(India) Mumbai City FC

== New contracts ==
No.	Pos.	Player	Date	Until	Source
3	DF	(England) Ryan Edwards	1 May 2024	30 April 2025	
1	GK	(India) Samik Mitra	1 May 2024	30 April 2027	
37	MF	(India) Jiteshwor Singh	19 May 2024	30 April 2025	
10	FW	(Scotland) Connor Shields	22 June 2024	30 April 2025	

== Transfers ==
=== In ===
Date	Player	Pos.	From	Fee
3 June 2024	(India) Jitendra Singh	CM	(India) Jamshedpur	Free Transfer
5 June 2024	(Brazil) Elsinho	DF	(India) Jamshedpur	Free Transfer
7 June 2024	(India) Laldinpuia	DF	(India) Jamshedpur	Free Transfer
9 June 2024	(Nigeria) Daniel Chima Chukwu	FW	(India) Jamshedpur	Free Transfer
11 June 2024	(Colombia) Wilmar Jordán	FW	(India) Punjab	Free Transfer
14 June 2024	(India) Kiyan Nassiri	FW	(India) Mohun Bagan SG	Free Transfer
16 June 2024	(India) Mandar Rao Dessai	DF	(India) East Bengal	Free Transfer
18 June 2024	(India) Gurkirat Singh	FW	(India) Mumbai City	Free Transfer
20 June 2024	(Brazil) Lukas Brambilla	MF	(Cyprus) Othellos Athienou	Free Transfer
25 June 2024	(India) Mohammad Nawaz	GK	(India) Mumbai City	Free Transfer
27 June 2024	(India) Lalrinliana Hnamte	MF	(India) Mohun Bagan SG	Free Transfer

=== Out ===
Date	No.	Player	Pos.	From	Fee
22 May 2024	16	(India) Sarthak Golui	RB/CB	(India) East Bengal	Loan Returns
23 May 2024	16	(Australia) Jordan Murray	ST	(India) Jamshedpur	Free Transfer
23 May 2024	32	(Italy) Cristian Battocchio	CM		Free Transfer
24 May 2024	27	(India) Aakash Sangwan	LB	(India) Goa	Free Transfer
26 May 2024	27	(India) Debjit Majumder	GK	(India) East Bengal	Free Transfer
24 May 2024	50	(Brazil) Rafael Crivellaro	AM/CM		Free Transfer
24 June 2024	50	(India) Ninthoinganba Meetei	ST	(India) Punjab	Free Transfer
9 July 2024		(India) Sweden Fernandes	ST		Free Transfer

== Competitions ==
=== Super Cup ===
Round of 16
20 April
8	Kerala Blasters	2
9	East Bengal	0
21 April
2	Goa	3
IL4	Gokulam Kerala	0
21 April
7	Odisha	0
10	Punjab	3
23 April
3	Bengaluru	1 (3)
IL2	Inter Kashi (p)	1 (5)
23 April
6	Mumbai City	4
11	Chennaiyin	0
24 April
4	Northeast United	6
13	Mohammedan	0
24 April
5	Jamshedpur	2
12	Hyderabad	0

Quarter-finals
26 April
8	Kerala Blasters	1
1	Mohun Bagan	2
26 April
2	Goa	2
10	Punjab	1
27 April
IL2	Inter Kashi	0
6	Mumbai City	1
27 April
4	Northeast United	0 (4)
5	Jamshedpur (p)	0 (5)

Semi-finals
30 April
1	Mohun Bagan	1
2	Goa	3
30 April
6	Mumbai City	0
5	Jamshedpur	1

Final
3 May
2	Goa	3
5	Jamshedpur	0

23 April 2025 Match 6	Mumbai City	4–0	Chennaiyin	Bhubaneswar
20:00 IST (UTC+5:30)	Karelis 43'; Chhangte 64', 86'; B. Singh 90'	AIFF; I-League; PDF		Stadium: Kalinga Stadium; Attendance: 1,149; Referee: Harish Kundu; Man of the Match: Lallianzuala Chhangte (Mumbai City)

=== Durand Cup ===
Chennaiyin were drawn in to the Group D on the group-stage draw conducted on 10 July, after the President on India, Droupadi Murmu, flagged-off the trophy tour of the tournament.

Pos	Team	Pld	W	D	L	GF	GA	GD	Pts	Qualification	ARM	JAM	CHN	ASR
1	Army Red	3	3	0	0	7	2	+5	9	Advanced to knockout stage				3–0
2	Jamshedpur (H)	3	2	0	1	7	4	+3	6		2–3		2–1	3–0
3	Chennaiyin	3	1	0	2	3	4	−1	3		0–1			2–1
4	Assam Rifles	3	0	0	3	1	8	−7	0					

Source: Twitter
Rules for classification: Group stage tiebreakers
(H) Hosts

==== Matches ====
The fixtures of the 133rd edition of the Durand Cup was announced by the organising committee on 12 July.

==== Matches ====
31 July 2024	Chennaiyin	0–1	Indian Army	Jamshedpur, Jharkhand
16:00 IST		Report	Liton Shil 42'	Stadium: JRD Tata Sports Complex; Attendance: 2,042; Referee: Harish Kundu; Man of the Match: Liton Shil (Indian Army)

4 August 2024	Jamshedpur	2–1	Chennaiyin	Jamshedpur, Jharkhand
19:00 IST	Wungngayam 32'; Murray 65'		Barretto 90+2'	Stadium: JRD Tata Sports Complex; Attendance: 6,137; Referee: Mrutyunjay L Amatya; Man of the Match: Imran (Jamshedpur FC)

11 August 2024	Chennaiyin	2–1	Assam Rifles	Jamshedpur, Jharkhand
19:00 IST	Jesuraj 89'; Praful Kumar 90+6'	Report	Jefferson Nongrud 76'	Stadium: JRD Tata Sports Complex; Attendance: 1012; Referee: Harish Kundu; Man of the Match: Shobhan Dev Biswas (Assam Rifles)

=== Bandodkar Trophy ===
24 August 2024
16:00 IST

Goa (India)	4–0	(India) Sporting Goa
Herrera 55', 61'; Sadiku 83'; Thangjam 89'	Report

24 August 2024
19:00 IST

Dempo (India)	1–5	(Australia) Brisbane Roar
Pires 80'	Report	Waddingham 47', 59'; Shour 63'; O'Shea 69'; Lofthouse 75'

27 August 2024
16:00 IST

Sporting Goa (India)	1–2	(India) Dempo
Alves 21'	Report	Hoble 32'; Rawat 73'

27 August 2024
19:00 IST

Brisbane Roar (Australia)	0–1	(India) Goa
	Report	Sadiku 51'

30 August 2024
16:00 IST

Brisbane Roar (Australia)	2–0	(India) Sporting Goa
Zabala 40'; Van Der Saag 45+4'	Report

30 August 2024
19:00 IST

Dempo (India)	1–2	(India) Goa
Rawat 58'	Report	Sadiku 17'; Chhetri 60'

Pos	Team	Pld	W	D	L	GF	GA	GD	Pts	Qualification	(India) ODI	(Argentina) DYJ	(India) CHN	(India) CBR
1	(India) Odisha	3	3	0	0	9	1	+8	9	Advance to knockout stage	—	2–1	1–0	6–0
2	(Argentina) Defensa y Justicia	3	2	0	1	4	2	+2	6	Advance to knockout stage	1–2	—	2–0	1–0
3	(India) Chennaiyin	3	1	0	2	4	4	0	3		0–1	0–2	—	4–1
4	(India) Churchill Brothers	3	0	0	3	1	11	−10	0		0–6	0–1	1–4	—

Source: GFA
25 August 2024
16:00 IST

Churchill (India)	1–4	(India) Chennaiyin
Diamande 19'	Report	Elsinho 12'; Jordán 31'; Singh 44'; Yadwad 65'

Referee: Mario Pereira
25 August 2024
21:00 IST

Odisha (India)	2–1	(Argentina) Defensa y Justicia
Raynier 68'; Delgado 79'	Report	Cruz 48'

28 August 2024
16:00 IST

Defensa y Justicia (Argentina)	1–0	(India) Churchill
Anthony 35'	Report

28 August 2024
19:00 IST

Odisha (India)	1–0	(India) Chennaiyin
Mauricio 40' (pen.)	Report

Referee: David Rebello

31 August 2024
16:00 IST

Churchill (India)	0–6	(India) Odisha
	Report	Krishna 21', 30', 36'; Aphaoba 43'; Mawihmingthanga 86', 90'

31 August 2024
19:00 IST

Chennaiyin (India)	0–2	(Argentina) Defensa y Justicia
	Report	Bohiler 14'; Valdez 45+4'

Semifinals
A1	(India) Goa	1
B2	(Argentina) Defensa y Justicia	0
B1	(India) Odisha	'2
A2	(Australia) Brisbane Roar	1

Final
A1	(India) Goa (p)	3 (3)
B1	(India) Odisha	3 (1)

=== Indian Super League ===
==== League table ====
Pos	Team	Pld	W	D	L	GF	GA	GD	Pts
9	East Bengal	24	8	4	12	27	33	−6	28 (Note: Head-to-head points: East Bengal 6, Punjab 0.)
10	Punjab	24	8	4	12	34	38	−4	28
11	Chennaiyin	24	7	6	11	34	39	−5	27
12	Hyderabad	24	4	6	14	22	47	−25	18
13	Mohammedan	24	2	7	15	12	43	−31	13

Source: ISL
Rules for classification: 1) points; 2) goal difference; 3) number of goals scored; 4) head-to-head points; 5) head-to-head goal difference; 6) head-to-head goals scored; 7) fair play ranking; 8) drawing of lots
(Note: Head-to-head record is used only after all the matches between the teams in question have been played).

==== Results summary ====
Overall								Home						Away					
Pld	W	D	L	GF	GA	GD	Pts	W	D	L	GF	GA	GD	W	D	L	GF	GA	GD
23	15	5	3	51	22	+29	50	9	1	1	29	11	+18	6	4	2	22	11	+11

Last updated: 8 February 2025.
Source: La Liga
