= 2023–24 Chennaiyin FC season =

2022–23 season of Chennaiyin FC

Chennaiyin
2023–2024 season
- Owner: Abhishek Bachchan; MS Dhoni; Vita Dani
- Head Coach: Owen Coyle
- Stadium: Jawaharlal Nehru Stadium
- Indian Super League: League: 6th Playoffs: TBD
- Federation Cup: TBD
- Durand Cup: Quarter Final
- Average home league attendance: 6,146
Home colours	Away colours	Third colours

The 2023–24 Chennaiyin season is the club's Tenth season since its establishment in 2014 as well as their Tenth season in 2023–24 Indian Super League season. In addition to the league, they will also compete in the 2023 Durand Cup and 2024 Indian Super Cup.

== Management team ==
Position	Name
Head coach	(Scotland) Owen Coyle
Assistant coach	(Scotland) Sandy Stewart
Assistant coach	(India) Raman Vijayan
Goalkeeping coach	(India) Rajat Ghosh Dastidar

== Players ==
=== Squad information ===
As of 22 September 2023

Notes:

- The table below mentions the squad listed by the league for the 2023–24 Indian Super League season.
- Flags indicate national team as defined under FIFA eligibility rules. Players may hold more than one non-FIFA nationality.

No.	Name	Nationality	Position(s)	Date of birth (age)	Contract until	Signed from
Goalkeepers
1	Samik Mitra	(India)	GK	1 December 2000 (age 25)	2024	(India) Indian Arrows
24	Debjit Majumder	(India)	GK	6 March 1988 (age 37)	2024	(India) East Bengal FC
51	Prateek Kumar Singh	(India)	GK	27 January 2000 (age 26)	2026	(India) Real Kashmir FC
Defenders
3	Ryan Edwards	(England)	CB	7 October 1993 (age 32)	2024	(Scotland) Dundee United
4	Lazar Ćirković	(Serbia)	CB	22 August 1992 (age 33)	2024	(Hungary) Budapest Honvéd
6	Ankit Mukherjee	(India)	RB/CB	10 June 1996 (age 29)	2025	(India) East Bengal FC
13	Ajith Kumar	(India)	RB	13 November 1996 (age 29)	2024	(India) Bengaluru FC
16	Sarthak Golui	(India)	RB/CB	3 November 1997 (age 28)	2024	(India) East Bengal FC
22	Sachu Siby	(India)	LB	31 May 2001 (age 24)	2026	(India) Kerala United FC
27	Aakash Sangwan	(India)	LB	28 October 1995 (age 30)	2024	(India) Punjab FC
31	Bijay Chhetri	(India)	CB	7 August 2001 (age 24)	2026	(India) Sreenidi Deccan FC
33	Bikash Yumnam	(India)	CB	2 January 2006 (age 20)	2024	(India) Punjab FC
41	Preyarhanjan RS	(India)	CB	15 August 1999 (age 26)	2024	Youth System
Midfielders
8	Mohammed Rafique	(India)	CM/RB	26 March 1991 (age 34)	2024	(India) East Bengal FC
18	Sourav Das	(India)	CM/CDM	20 June 1996 (age 29)	2024	(India) East Bengal FC
19	Sajal Bag	(India)	CM	19 May 2003 (age 22)	2024	(India) BSS Sporting
30	Ayush Adhikari	(India)	CM/AM	30 July 2000 (age 25)	2026	(India) Kerala Blasters FC
32	Cristian Battocchio	(Italy)	CM	10 February 1992 (age 33)	2024	(Israel) Sektzia Ness Ziona F.C.
37	Jiteshwor Singh	(India)	CM/CDM	10 December 2001 (age 24)	2024	(India) NEROCA
50	Rafael Crivellaro	(Brazil)	AM/CM	18 February 1989 (age 36)	2024	(India) Jamshedpur FC
Forwards
7	Ninthoi Meetei	(India)	RW/RM	13 July 2001 (age 24)	2024	(India) NorthEast United FC
10	Connor Shields	(Scotland)	ST/AM	29 July 1997 (age 28)	2024	(Scotland) Motherwell FC
11	Rahim Ali	(India)	ST/RW	21 May 2000 (age 25)	2024	(India) Indian Arrows
14	Alexander Romario Jesuraj	(India)	RW	26 July 1996 (age 29)	2025	(India) FC Goa
17	Jordan Murray	(Australia)	ST	2 October 1995 (age 30)	2024	(Thailand) Swat Cat FC
23	Sweden Fernandes	(India)	RW/RM	18 February 2000 (age 25)	2026	(India) Hyderabad FC
29	Irfan Yadwad	(India)	ST	19 June 2001 (age 24)	2026	(India) FC Bengaluru United
43	Thanglalsoun Gangte	(India)	ST	22 April 2006 (age 19)	2026	(India) Sudeva Delhi FC U18
47	Vincy Barretto	(India)	LW/RW	8 December 1999 (age 26)	2025	(India) Kerala Blasters
71	Farukh Choudhary	(India)	LW	8 November 1996 (age 29)	2025	(India) Jamshedpur FC
	Gulab Rauth	(India)	LW	26 April 2003 (age 22)	2024	(India) RF Young Champs

== Players out on loan ==
Date	Player	Pos.	To	Loan Until
1 September 2023	(India) Devansh Dabas	GK	(India) Gokulam Kerala FC	31 May 2024
10 September 2023	(India) Sweden Fernandes	RW/RM	(India) Punjab FC	31 May 2024
	(India) Sajal Bag	CM	(India) Aizawl FC	31 May 2024

== Durand Cup squad ==
=== Squad information ===
A total of 25 players were named in the 2023/24 Durand Cup Squad.

As of 26 August 2023

No.	Name	Nationality	Position(s)	Date of birth (age)	Contract until	Signed from
Goalkeepers
1	Samik Mitra	(India)	GK	1 December 2000 (age 25)	2024	(India) Indian Arrows
24	Debjit Majumder	(India)	GK	6 March 1988 (age 37)	2024	(India) East Bengal FC
51	Prateek Kumar Singh	(India)	GK	27 January 2000 (age 26)	2026	(India) Real Kashmir FC
Defenders
6	Ankit Mukherjee	(India)	RB/CB	10 June 1996 (age 29)	2025	(India) East Bengal FC
13	Ajith Kumar	(India)	RB	13 November 1996 (age 29)	2024	(India) Bengaluru FC
16	Sarthak Golui	(India)	RB/CB	3 November 1997 (age 28)	2024	(India) East Bengal FC
22	Sachu Siby	(India)	LB	31 May 2001 (age 24)	2026	(India) Kerala United FC
27	Aakash Sangwan	(India)	LB	28 October 1995 (age 30)	2024	(India) Punjab FC
31	Bijay Chhetri	(India)	CB	7 August 2001 (age 24)	2026	(India) Sreenidi Deccan FC
33	Bikash Yumnam	(India)	CB	6 September 2003 (age 22)	2025	(India) Punjab FC
Midfielders
8	Mohammed Rafique	(India)	CM/RB	26 March 1991 (age 34)	2024	(India) East Bengal FC
19	Sajal Bag	(India)	CM	19 May 2003 (age 22)	2024	(India) BSS Sporting
30	Ayush Adhikari	(India)	CM/AM	30 July 2000 (age 25)	2026	(India) Kerala Blasters FC
32	Cristian Battocchio	(Italy)	CM	10 February 1992 (age 33)	2024	(Israel) Sektzia Ness Ziona F.C.
37	Jiteshwor Singh	(India)	CM/CDM	10 December 2001 (age 24)	2024	(India) NEROCA
50	Rafael Crivellaro	(Brazil)	AM/CM	18 February 1989 (age 36)	2024	(India) Jamshedpur FC
Forwards
7	Ninthoi Meetei	(India)	RW/RM	13 July 2001 (age 24)	2024	(India) NorthEast United FC
10	Connor Shields	(Scotland)	ST/AM	29 July 1997 (age 28)	2024	(Scotland) Motherwell FC
11	Rahim Ali	(India)	ST/RW	21 May 2000 (age 25)	2024	(India) Indian Arrows
14	Alexander Romario Jesuraj	(India)	RW	26 July 1996 (age 29)	2025	(India) FC Goa
17	Jordan Murray	(Australia)	ST	2 October 1995 (age 30)	2024	(Thailand) Swat Cat FC
23	Sweden Fernandes	(India)	RW/RM	18 February 2000 (age 25)	2026	(India) Hyderabad FC
29	Irfan Yadwad	(India)	ST	19 June 2001 (age 24)	2026	(India) FC Bengaluru United
47	Vincy Barretto	(India)	LW/RW	8 December 1999 (age 26)	2025	(India) Kerala Blasters
71	Farukh Choudhary	(India)	LW	8 November 1996 (age 29)	2025	(India) Jamshedpur FC

== ISL squad ==
=== Squad information ===
A total of 30 players were named in the 2023/24 Indian Super League Squad.

As of 20 September 2023

- * denotes a player who is unavailable for rest of the season.

No.	Name	Nationality	Position(s)	Date of birth (age)	Contract until	Signed from
Goalkeepers
1	Samik Mitra	(India)	GK	1 December 2000 (age 25)	2024	(India) Indian Arrows
24	Debjit Majumder	(India)	GK	6 March 1988 (age 37)	2024	(India) East Bengal FC
40	Mohanraj K	(India)	GK	24 June 2004 (age 21)	2024	(India) Chennaiyin FC B
51	Prateek Kumar Singh	(India)	GK	27 January 2000 (age 26)	2026	(India) Real Kashmir FC
Defenders
6	Ankit Mukherjee	(India)	RB/CB	10 June 1996 (age 29)	2025	(India) East Bengal FC
13	Ajith Kumar	(India)	RB	13 November 1996 (age 29)	2024	(India) Bengaluru FC
16	Sarthak Golui	(India)	RB/CB	3 November 1997 (age 28)	2024	(India) East Bengal FC
22	Sachu Siby	(India)	LB	31 May 2001 (age 24)	2026	(India) Kerala United FC
27	Aakash Sangwan	(India)	LB	28 October 1995 (age 30)	2024	(India) Punjab FC
31	Bijay Chhetri	(India)	CB	7 August 2001 (age 24)	2026	(India) Sreenidi Deccan FC
33	Bikash Yumnam	(India)	CB	6 September 2003 (age 22)	2025	(India) Punjab FC
41	Preyarhanjan RS	(India)	RB	2 January 2006 (age 20)	2024	(India) Chennaiyin FC B
	Lazar Ćirković	(Serbia)	CB	22 August 1992 (age 33)	2024	(Hungary) Budapest Honvéd FC
	Ryan Edwards	(England)	CB	7 October 1993 (age 32)	2024	(Scotland) Dundee United FC
Midfielders
5	Cristian Battocchio	(Italy)	CM	10 February 1992 (age 33)	2024	(Israel) Sektzia Ness Ziona F.C.
7	Ninthoi Meetei	(India)	RW/RM	13 July 2001 (age 24)	2024	(India) NorthEast United FC
8	Mohammed Rafique	(India)	CM/RB	26 March 1991 (age 34)	2024	(India) East Bengal FC
14	Alexander Romario Jesuraj	(India)	RW	26 July 1996 (age 29)	2025	(India) FC Goa
18	Sourav Das	(India)	CM/CDM	20 June 1996 (age 29)	2024	(India) East Bengal FC
30	Ayush Adhikari	(India)	CM/AM	30 July 2000 (age 25)	2026	(India) Kerala Blasters FC
37	Jiteshwor Singh	(India)	CM/CDM	10 December 2001 (age 24)	2024	(India) NEROCA
44	Nesta JB Colin	(India)	CM	8 June 2006 (age 19)	2024	(India) Chennaiyin FC B
50	Rafael Crivellaro	(Brazil)	AM/CM	18 February 1989 (age 36)	2024	(India) Jamshedpur FC
71	Farukh Choudhary	(India)	LW	8 November 1996 (age 29)	2025	(India) Jamshedpur FC
Forwards
10	Connor Shields	(Scotland)	ST/AM	29 July 1997 (age 28)	2024	(Scotland) Motherwell FC
11	Rahim Ali	(India)	ST/RW	21 May 2000 (age 25)	2024	(India) Indian Arrows
17	Jordan Murray	(Australia)	ST	2 October 1995 (age 30)	2024	(Thailand) Swat Cat FC
29	Irfan Yadwad	(India)	ST	19 June 2001 (age 24)	2026	(India) FC Bengaluru United
43	Thanglalsoun Gangte	(India)	ST	22 April 2006 (age 19)	2026	(India) Sudeva Delhi FC U18
47	Vincy Barretto	(India)	LW/RW	8 December 1999 (age 26)	2025	(India) Kerala Blasters

== Transfers ==
=== In ===
Date	No.	Player	Pos.	From	Fee
29 June 2023	23	(India) Sweden Fernandes	RW/RM	(India) Hyderabad FC	Free Transfer
2 July 2023	6	(India) Ankit Mukherjee	RB/CB	(India) East Bengal FC	Free Transfer
2 July 2023	31	(India) Bijay Chhetri	CB	(India) Sreenidi Deccan FC	Free Transfer
6 July 2023	51	(India) Prateek Kumar Singh	GK	(India) Real Kashmir FC	Free Transfer
6 July 2023	22	(India) Sachu Siby	LB	(India) Kerala United FC	Free Transfer
7 July 2023	29	(India) Irfan Yadwad	ST	(India) FC Bengaluru United	Free Transfer
11 July 2023	71	(India) Farukh Choudhary	LW	(India) Jamshedpur FC	Free Transfer
13 July 2023	17	(Australia) Jordan Murray	ST	(Thailand) Swat Cat FC	Free Transfer
26 July 2023	10	(Scotland) Connor Shields	ST/AM	(Scotland) Motherwell FC	Free Transfer
5 August 2023	50	(Brazil) Rafael Crivellaro	AM	(India) Jamshedpur FC	Free Transfer
6 August 2023	30	(India) Ayush Adhikari	CM/AM	(India) Kerala Blasters FC	
21 August 2023	5	(Italy) Cristian Battocchio	CM	(Israel) Sektzia Ness Ziona F.C.	Free Transfer
25 August 2023	16	(India) Sarthak Golui	RB/CB	(India) East Bengal FC	Loan Transfer
31 August 2023	40	(India) Mohanraj K	GK	(India) Chennaiyin FC B	Free Transfer
31 August 2023	44	(India) Nesta JB Colin	CM	(India) Chennaiyin FC B	Free Transfer
31 August 2023	41	(India) Preyarhanjan RS	RB	(India) Chennaiyin FC B	Free Transfer
3 September 2023	43	(India) Thanglalsoun Gangte	ST	(India) Sudeva Delhi FC U18	Free Transfer
16 September 2023		(Serbia) Lazar Ćirković	CB	(Hungary) Budapest Honvéd FC	Free Transfer
20 September 2023		(England) Ryan Edwards	CB	(Scotland) Dundee United FC	Free Transfer

=== Out ===
Date	No.	Player	Pos.	From	Fee
9 June 2023	28	(India) Monotosh Chakladar	LB/CB	(India) Diamond Harbour FC	Free Transfer

== Competitions ==
=== Overall record ===
Competition	First match	Last match	Starting round	Final position	Record							
Competition	First match	Last match	Starting round	Final position	Pld	W	D	L	GF	GA	GD	Win %
Indian Super League	23 September 2023	TBC	Matchday 1	TBC	22	8	3	11	26	36	−10	36.36
Durand Cup	10 August 2023	26 August 2023	Group stage	Quarter Final	4	3	0	1	9	6	+3	75.00
Federation Cup	TBC	TBC	Group Stage	TBC	0	0	0	0	0	0	+0	—
Total					26	11	3	12	35	42	−7	42.31

Last updated: 16 December 2023
Source: Competitions

=== Indian Super League ===
==== League table ====
Pos	Team	Pld	W	D	L	GF	GA	GD	Pts	Qualification
4	Odisha	22	11	6	5	35	23	+12	39	Qualification for the knockouts
5	Kerala Blasters	22	10	3	9	32	31	+1	33	Qualification for the knockouts
6	Chennaiyin	22	8	3	11	26	36	−10	27	Qualification for the knockouts
7	NorthEast United	22	6	8	8	28	32	−4	26	
8	Punjab	22	6	6	10	28	35	−7	24 (Note: Head-to-head points: Punjab 4, East Bengal 1.)	

Source: Indian Super League
Rules for classification: 1) points; 2) head-to-head points; 3) head-to-head goal difference; 4) head-to-head goals scored; 5) goal difference; 6) number of goals scored; 7) fair play ranking

=== Matches ===
Win Draw Loss Void / Postponed

23 September 2023 1	Odisha	2–0	Chennaiyin	Bhubaneswar
19:30 IST	Jerry Mawihmingthanga 45'; Diego Maurício 63'			Stadium: Kalinga Stadium

29 September 2023 2	NorthEast United	3–0	Chennaiyin	Guwahati
19:30 IST	Parthib Gogoi 42'; Phalguni Singh 48'; Asheer Akhtar 90+10'			Stadium: Indira Gandhi Athletic Stadium

7 October 2023 3	Chennaiyin	1–3	Mohun Bagan SG	Chennai
20:00 IST	Rafael Crivellaro 54'		Petratos 22'; Cummings 45+3'; Manvir 56'	Stadium: Jawaharlal Nehru Stadium (Chennai); Referee: Ashwin; Man of the Match: Sahal Abdul Samad

23 October 2023 4	Chennaiyin	1–0	Hyderabad	Chennai
17:30 IST	Connor Shields 7'			Stadium: Jawaharlal Nehru Stadium

29 October 2023 5	Chennaiyin	5–1	Punjab FC	Chennai
17:30 IST	Ryan Edwards 24'; Connor Shields 27', 56'; Rafael Crivellaro 45+1' (P); Vincy Barretto 84'		Krishananda Singh 86'	Stadium: Jawaharlal Nehru Stadium

5 November 2023 6	FC Goa	3–0	Chennaiyin	Guwahati
19:30 IST	Boris Singh 13'; Rowllin Borges 24'; Udanta Singh 72'			Stadium: Indira Gandhi Athletic Stadium

25 November 2023 7	Chennaiyin	1–1	East Bengal	Chennai
17:30 IST	Edwards (yellow card) 57' (yellow-red card) 90+6'; Meitei 86'	Report	Adhikari 29' (o.g.); Pardo (yellow card) 90+1'	Stadium: Jawaharlal Nehru Stadium; Attendance: 6,329; Referee: Crystal John; Man of the Match: Rafael Crivellaro (Chennaiyin)

29 November 2023 8	Kerala Blasters	3–3	Chennaiyin	Kochi
20:00 IST	Diamantakos 11' (pen.), 59'; Peprah 24'; Naocha (yellow card) 81'	Report	Ali 1'; Murray 13' (pen.), 24'	Stadium: Jawaharlal Nehru Stadium; Attendance: 22,715; Referee: Aditya Purkayastha; Man of the Match: Jordan Murray (Chennaiyin)

7 December 2023 9	Jamshedpur FC	2–2	Chennaiyin	Jamshedpur
20:00 IST	Laldinpuia 45+4'; Daniel Chima Chukwu 90'		Farukh Choudhary 9'; Meitei 40'	Stadium: JRD Tata Sports Complex

13 December 2023 10	Chennaiyin	2–0	Bengaluru	Chennai
20:00 IST	Rafael Crivellaro 6' (P); Murray 50' (P)			Stadium: Jawaharlal Nehru Stadium

=== Durand Cup ===
Chennaiyin were drawn in the Group E for the 132nd edition of the Durand Cup.

==== Group stage ====
Pos	Team	Pld	W	D	L	GF	GA	GD	Pts	Qualification	CHN	HYD	DEL	(Nepal) TRI
1	Chennaiyin	3	3	0	0	8	2	+6	9	Qualify for the knockout stage	—	—	—	3–0
2	Hyderabad	3	1	1	1	5	4	+1	4		1–3	—	—	3–0
3	Delhi	3	0	2	1	3	4	−1	2		1–2	1–1	—	1–1
4	(Nepal) Tribhuvan Army	3	0	1	2	1	7	−6	1		—	—	—	—

Source: Twitter
Rules for classification: Group stage tiebreakers

==== Matches ====
Durand Cup fixtures were announced in early July 2023.

10 August 2023	Hyderabad	1–3	Chennaiyin	Guwahati
15.00 IST	Sana 4' (pen.)	Report	Saji 6' (o.g.); Shields 15'; Murray 47'	Stadium: Indira Gandhi Athletic Stadium; Referee: Crystal John; Man of the Match: Connor Shields (Chennaiyin)

14 August 2023	Chennaiyin	3–0	(Nepal) Tribhuvan Army	Guwahati
15.00 IST	Choudhary 23'; R. Ali 40'; Crivellaro 84'	Report		Stadium: Indira Gandhi Athletic Stadium; Man of the Match: Rafael Crivellaro (Chennaiyin)

18 August 2023	Delhi	1–2	Chennaiyin	Guwahati
15.00 IST	Gassama 54'	Report	Crivellaro 38'; Barretto 51'	Stadium: Indira Gandhi Athletic Stadium; Man of the Match: Vanlalhriatzuala K (Delhi)

=== Quarter-finals ===
26 August 2023	Goa	4–1	Chennaiyin	Guwahati
18:00 IST	Carl McHugh 29'; Carlos Martínez 37'; Noah Sadaoui 90+2'; Víctor Rodríguez 90+4'	Report	Bikash Yumnam 5'	Stadium: Indira Gandhi Athletic Stadium

== Statistics ==
=== Goalscorers ===
Rank	No.	Pos.	Nationality	Player	ISL	Super Cup	Durand Cup	Total
1	50	MF	(Brazil)	Rafael Crivellaro	3	0	2	5
2	10	FW	(England)	Connor Shields	3	0	1	4
2	17	FW	(Australia)	Jordan Murray	3	0	1	4
4	2	DF	(England)	Ryan Edwards	2	0	0	2
4	11	FW	(India)	Rahim Ali	1	0	1	2
4	47	FW	(India)	Vincy Barretto	1	0	1	2
4	71	MF	(India)	Farukh Choudhary	1	0	1	2
8	7	MF	(India)	Ninthoi Meetei	1	0	0	1
8	33	DF	(India)	Bikash Yumnam	0	0	1	1
Own Goals					0	–	1	1
Totals					15	0	9	24
