= 2022–23 Jamshedpur FC season =

2022–23 season of Jamshedpur FC

Jamshedpur FC
2022–23 season
- Chairman: (India) Chanakya Chaudhary
- Head coach: (England) Aidy Boothroyd
- Stadium: JRD Tata Sports Complex, Jamshedpur, Jharkhand
- Indian Super League: 10th
- Super Cup: Semi-finals
- Durand Cup: Group stage
- Top goalscorer: League: Ritwik Das (6 goals); All: Ritwik Das (6 goals)
- Highest home attendance: 22,389 (vs NorthEast United)
- Lowest home attendance: 7,430 (vs Mumbai City)
- Average home league attendance: 14,652
- Biggest win: 3–0 (vs ATK Mohun Bagan (H), 14 April 2023, Super Cup)
- Biggest defeat: 3–0 (vs Mohammedan (A), 21 August 2022, Durand Cup); 3–0 (vs Goa (A), 3 October 2022, Indian Super League); 0–3 (vs Bengaluru (H), 18 January 2023, Indian Super League)
Home colours	Away colours
- All statistics correct as of 21 April 2023.

The 2022–23 season is the sixth season in Jamshedpur FC's existence, and their fifth season in the Indian Super League. This season of the ISL witnesses the return of the home-away format of the matches similar to that of the 2019–20 Indian Super League season after a break of two years due to the COVID-19 pandemic in the country.

== Background ==
After a great record-breaking season of 2021–22 on 22 March 2022 club officially announced that Head Coach, Owen Coyle won't be continuing his journey at Jamshedpur. The club released an official statement stating:

Jamshedpur FC Head Coach, Owen Coyle officially announced today that he won't be continuing his journey in India in the next season of Hero Indian Super League. The Scotsman had a successful two years with the club which he continuously kept on improving with his smart signings, promotion of young players and amazing man-management skills. He lifted the Jamshedpur side to 6th place in 2020-21, just 4 points shy off the top-4 places and later in 2021-22 propelled them to the top of the table with a historic Hero ISL League Shield Winners’ campaign where his team smashed and steamrolled upon records.

On 10 July 2022, Aidy Boothroyd was appointed as head coach of Jamshedpur. He said: "Jamshedpur FC are the Champions of India currently and the city has a tremendous football legacy. We want to continue this upward trajectory and make the club reach places and win honours that our fans are dreaming of. We want to take the club to the next level and to compete really with the top teams of Asia."

On 14 July 2022, Jamshedpur FC confirmed the extension of Leslie Cleevely's contract as goalkeeping coach. Cleevely signed until May 2023 and joined Aidy Boothroyd's coaching staff. Asked about extending his stay at Jamshedpur, he said, "When I received the offer to come back as goalkeeping coach and defend our Hero ISL league title, it didn't take any persuasion. I'm looking forward to getting to work with our exciting roster of goalkeepers and of course Aidy Boothroyd who is a fantastic coach and the right man for the job."

On 16 July 2022 club appoints Stuart Watkiss as Assistant Coach. Upon signing for the ISL League Shield winners Stuart opined his ambition with JFC, "It's a big job at Jamshedpur FC, the defending Champions of India. I come with the aim to help the club win back-to-back league titles and also help bring more honours. Along with a top Head Coach like Aidy Boothroyd, the club aims for the maximum and we will take it one game at a time. Looking forward to it."

Narender Gahlot, Mobashir Rahman, Greg Stewart and Jordan Murray leaves club after the season.

=== December ===
On 6 December, Wellington Priori's contract was terminated by mutual agreement with immediate effect. The Brazilian returned to the Red Miners set-up ahead of the start of the 2022–23 campaign and played in six matches for the club.

On 7 December, the Red Miners completed the signing of Rafael Crivellaro, till the end of the season.

On 26 December, the Red Miners announced the departure of midfielder SK Sahil to Mohammedan, on loan till the end of the season.

On 30 December, the Red Miners announced the signing of Australian defender Dylan Fox, till the end of the season after captain Peter Hartley parted ways by mutual consent.

=== January ===
On 7 January, the Men of Steel announced the signing of Pronay Halder, on a contract till May 2024.

== Players ==
=== Current squad ===
As of 6 December 2022

Note: Flags indicate national team as defined under FIFA eligibility rules; some limited exceptions apply. Players may hold more than one non-FIFA nationality.

No.	Pos.	Nation	Player
1	GK	IND	Rakshit Dagar
2	FW	IND	Boris Singh
3	MF	IND	Jitendra Singh
4	DF	IND	Laldinpuia
6	DF	IND	Ricky Lallawmawma
7	FW	IND	Len Doungel
8	FW	AUS	Harry Sawyer
9	FW	IND	Ishan Pandita
10	FW	ENG	Jay Emmanuel-Thomas
11	FW	IND	Komal Thatal
12	DF	NIR	Dylan Fox
13	DF	BRA	Eli Sabia
14	MF	IND	Pronay Halder

No.	Pos.	Nation	Player
16	DF	IND	Muhammad Uvais
17	FW	IND	Farukh Choudhary
18	MF	IND	Ritwik Das
24	DF	IND	Pratik Chaudhari
26	DF	IND	Laldinliana Renthlei
27	MF	IND	Sk Sahil
28	MF	IND	Germanpreet Singh
31	GK	IND	Vishal Yadav
32	GK	IND	Rehenesh TP
47	GK	IND	Mohit Dhami
50	MF	BRA	Rafael Crivellaro (captain)
99	FW	NGR	Daniel Chima Chukwu

== Pre-season and friendlies ==
Win Draw Loss

28 August 2022 Friendly	Jamshedpur	6–0	Tata Motors	Jamshedpur, Jharkhand
16:00 IST	Pandita x3; Boris; Das; Choudhary	Report		Stadium: JRD Tata Sports Complex

4 September 2022 Friendly	Jamshedpur	12–0	Tata Steel	Jamshedpur, Jharkhand
16:00 IST	Emmanuel-Thomas x4; Chukwu x3; Pandita x3; Boris; Priori	Report		Stadium: JFC Flatlet Ground

9 September 2022 Friendly	Sreenidi Deccan	2–1	Jamshedpur	Aziznagar, Telangana
09:30 IST	Castañeda 79'; Louis 90'	Report	Singh 28'	Stadium: Deccan Arena

14 September 2022 Friendly	Goa	1–1	Jamshedpur	Salvador do Mundo, Goa
18:00 IST	Vázquez 35'	Report	Singh 69'	Stadium: Salvador do Mundo Ground

24 September 2022 Friendly	Jamshedpur	0–2	RoundGlass Punjab	Jamshedpur, Jharkhand
15:00 IST		Report	Oliveira 60'; Lalhlimpuia 90'	Stadium: JFC Flatlet Ground

28 September 2022 Friendly	Jamshedpur	3–0	Sreenidi Deccan	Jamshedpur, Jharkhand
08:00 IST	Das; Chukwu x2	Report		Stadium: JFC Flatlet Ground

4 October 2022 Friendly	Jamshedpur	3–0	Real Kashmir	Jamshedpur, Jharkhand
19:00 IST	Chukwu; Sabiá; Choudhary	Report		Stadium: JFC Flatlet Ground

== Competitions ==
=== Overview ===
Win Draw Loss

Competition	First match	Last match	Starting round	Record							
Competition	First match	Last match	Starting round	Pld	W	D	L	GF	GA	GD	Win %
Durand Cup	17 August 2022	1 September 2022	Group Stage	4	2	0	2	4	6	−2	50.00
Super Cup	10 April 2023	21 April 2023	Group Stage	4	3	0	1	11	7	+4	75.00
Indian Super League	11 October 2022	22 February 2023	Matchday 1	20	5	4	11	21	32	−11	25.00
play–offs for AFC Champions league	4 April 2023	4 April 2023	One-Off	1	0	0	1	1	3	−2	0.00
Total				29	10	4	15	37	48	−11	34.48

Last updated: 21 April 2023
Source: Soccerway

=== Durand Cup ===
Jamshedpur were drawn in the Group A for the 131st edition of the Durand Cup along with two other ISL sides.

==== Group stage ====
Pos	Team	Pld	W	D	L	GF	GA	GD	Pts	Qualification	MOH	BEN	JAM	GOA	IAF
1	Mohammedan (H)	4	3	1	0	9	2	+7	10	Qualify for the Knockout stage	—	1–1	3–0	3–1	2–0
2	Bengaluru	4	2	2	0	9	4	+5	8	Qualify for the Knockout stage	—	—	2–1	2–2	4–0
3	Jamshedpur	4	2	0	2	4	6	−2	6		—	—	—	1–0	2–1
4	Goa	4	1	1	2	4	6	−2	4		—	—	—	—	1–0
5	Indian Air Force	4	0	0	4	1	9	−8	0		—	—	—	—	—

Source: Sportstar
Rules for classification: 1) points; 2) head-to-head points; 3) head-to-head goal difference; 4) goal difference; 5) number of goals scored; 6) drawing of lots
(H) Hosts

===== Matches =====
Win Draw Loss

==== Group stage ====
17 August 2022 1	Jamshedpur	1–2	Bengaluru	Kolkata, West Bengal
14.30 IST	Thakuri (yellow card) 25'; Angelo (yellow card) 40'; Rishi 61'	Report	Chhetri 23'; Mondal (yellow card) 42' (yellow-red card) 58'; Krishna 56'; Shrivas (yellow card) 86'	Stadium: Kishore Bharati Krirangan; Referee: Rahul Kumar Gupta; Man of the Match: Sunil Chhetri (Bengaluru)

21 August 2022 2	Mohammedan	3–0	Jamshedpur	Kolkata, West Bengal
18.00 IST	Rahman 38'; Abhishek 71'; Faiaz 74'	Report		Stadium: Kishore Bharati Krirangan; Referee: Senthil Nathan; Man of the Match: Sairuat Kima (Mohammedan)

26 August 2022 3	Jamshedpur	1–0	Goa	Kolkata, West Bengal
18.00 IST	Poojary (yellow card) 45+2'; Hijam (yellow card) 56'; Tapan 84'	Report	Lalremruata (yellow card) 90'	Stadium: Vivekananda Yuba Bharati Krirangan; Referee: C R Srikrishna; Man of the Match: Tapan Halder (Jamshedpur)

1 September 2022 4	Jamshedpur	2–1	Indian Air Force	Kolkata, West Bengal
18.00 IST	Thakuri 26'; Bist (yellow card) 65'; Lalruatmawia 84'	Report	Danish (yellow card) 19'; Somananda 39'	Stadium: Kishore Bharati Krirangan; Referee: Surojit Das; Man of the Match: Lalruatmawia (Jamshedpur)

=== Indian Super League ===
This season of the Indian Super League will be played across the country in home and away formats after two seasons of hosting it in Goa due to the COVID-19 pandemic.

==== League table ====
Pos	Team	Pld	W	D	L	GF	GA	GD	Pts
7	Goa	20	8	3	9	36	35	+1	27 (Note: Head-to-head points: Goa 3, Chennaiyin 3. Head-to-head goal difference: Goa +1, Chennaiyin -1.)
8	Chennaiyin	20	7	6	7	36	37	−1	27
9	East Bengal	20	6	1	13	22	38	−16	19 (Note: Head-to-head points: East Bengal 3, Jamshedpur 3. Head-to-head goal difference: East Bengal +1, Jamshedpur -1.)
10	Jamshedpur	20	5	4	11	21	32	−11	19
11	NorthEast United	20	1	2	17	20	55	−35	5

Source: Indian Super League
Rules for classification: 1) points; 2) head-to-head points; 3) head-to-head goal difference; 4) head-to-head goals scored; 5) goal difference; 6) number of goals scored; 7) fair play ranking; 8) drawing of lots

==== League results by round ====
Match	1	2	3	4	5	6	7	8	9	10	11	12	13	14	15	16	17	18	19	20
Ground	H	A	H	A	H	A	H	H	A	A	H	A	H	A	H	H	A	H	A	A
Result	L	D	W	L	L	L	L	L	L	L	D	L	D	W	L	L	W	D	W	W
Position	8	10	6	8	9	9	10	10	10	10	10	10	10	10	10	10	10	10	10	10

Updated to match(es) played on 22 February 2023. Source: Indian Super League
A = Away; H = Home; W = Win; D = Draw; L = Loss

===== Matches =====
Note: Indian Super League announced the fixtures for the 2022–23 season on 1 September 2022 with the fixture between the Blasters and East Bengal on 7 October serving as the opening match of the season.

11 October 2022 1	Jamshedpur	2–3	Odisha	Jamshedpur, Jharkhand
19:30 IST	Chukwu 3'; Boris 10'; Renthlei (yellow card) 47'; Hartley (yellow card) 62'; Das (yellow card) 84'	Report	Maurício 17', 90+1' (yellow card) 90+1'; Issac 88'	Stadium: JRD Tata Sports Complex; Attendance: 19,213; Referee: Rowan Arumughan; Man of the Match: Diego Maurício (Odisha)

22 October 2022 2	Mumbai City	1–1	Jamshedpur	Mumbai, Maharashtra
17:30 IST	Chhangte 8'; Singh (yellow card) 36'; Apuia (yellow card) 44'; Jahouh (yellow card) 57'	Report	Chukwu 12'; Boris (yellow card) 35'; Priori (yellow card) 44'; Lallawmawma (yellow card) 82'	Stadium: Mumbai Football Arena; Attendance: 3,733; Referee: Ramachandran Venkatesh; Man of the Match: Mehtab Singh (Mumbai City)

30 October 2022 3	Jamshedpur	1–0	NorthEast United	Jamshedpur, Jharkhand
19:30 IST	Hartley 30'	Report	Gogoi (yellow card) 88'	Stadium: JRD Tata Sports Complex; Attendance: 22,389; Referee: I Jamal Mohamed; Man of the Match: Peter Hartley (Jamshedpur)

3 October 2022 4	Goa	3–0	Jamshedpur	Margao, Goa
19:30 IST	Guarrotxena 2'; Sadaoui 12'; Ali (yellow card) 81'; Fernandes 90+3'	Report	Chaudhari (yellow card) 88'	Stadium: Fatorda Stadium; Attendance: 13,123; Referee: Pranjal Banerjee; Man of the Match: Iker Guarrotxena (Goa)

9 November 2022 5	Jamshedpur	0–1	Hyderabad	Jamshedpur, Jharkhand
19:30 IST	Sawyer (yellow card) 45+4'; Hartley (yellow card) 90+1'	Report	Mishra (yellow card) 34'; Yasir 48'; Kumar (yellow card) 84'; Victor (yellow card) 90+5'	Stadium: JRD Tata Sports Complex; Attendance: 20,189; Referee: Pratik Mondal; Man of the Match: Odei Onaindia (Hyderabad)

19 November 2022 6	Chennaiyin	3–1	Jamshedpur	Chennai, Tamil Nadu
17:30 IST	Slišković 27'; Kumar (yellow card) 35'; Hakhamaneshi (yellow card) 45+1'; Düker (yellow card) 59'; Diagne (yellow card) 61'; Barretto 77'; El Khayati 85'	Report	Pandita 76'	Stadium: Jawaharlal Nehru Stadium; Attendance: 9,788; Referee: L Priyobarta Singh; Man of the Match: Abdenasser El Khayati (Chennaiyin)

27 November 2022 7	Jamshedpur	1–3	East Bengal	Jamshedpur, Jharkhand
19:30 IST	Hartley (yellow card) 26'; Emmanuel-Thomas 40' (pen.); Renthlei (yellow card) 45+1'; Singh (yellow card) 70'	Report	Suhair 2' (yellow card) 36'; Silva 26', 58'; Lalchungnunga (yellow card) 29'	Stadium: JRD Tata Sports Complex; Attendance: 18,893; Referee: Crystal John; Man of the Match: Naorem Mahesh Singh (East Bengal)

4 December 2022 8	Jamshedpur	0–1	Kerala Blasters	Jamshedpur, Jharkhand
19:30 IST	Chukwu (yellow card) 31'	Report	Diamantakos 17'; Luna (yellow card) 45+2'; Kumar (yellow card) 67'; Singh (yellow card) 72'	Stadium: JRD Tata Sports Complex; Attendance: 16,417; Referee: Tejas Nagvenkar; Man of the Match: Marko Lešković (Kerala Blasters)

8 December 2022 9	ATK Mohun Bagan	1–0	Jamshedpur	Kolkata, West Bengal
19:30 IST	Kuruniyan (yellow card) 81'; Boumous 90+1' (pen.) (yellow card) 90+4'	Report	Boris (yellow card) 81'; Hartley (yellow card) 87' (red card) 90'; Chukwu (yellow card) 90'	Stadium: Vivekananda Yuba Bharati Krirangan; Attendance: 15,217; Referee: Rahul Kumar Gupta; Man of the Match: Deepak Tangri (ATK Mohun Bagan)

17 December 2022 10	Bengaluru	1–0	Jamshedpur	Bengaluru, Karnataka
17:30 IST	Farooq 5'; Suresh (yellow card) 65'; Shrivas (yellow card) 85'; Kumar (yellow card) 85'	Report	Boris (yellow card) 44'; Chaudhari (yellow card) 77'	Stadium: Sree Kanteerava Stadium; Attendance: 8,726; Referee: R Venkatesh; Man of the Match: Danish Farooq (Bengaluru)

22 December 2022 11	Jamshedpur	2–2	Goa	Jamshedpur, Jharkhand
19:30 IST	Guarrotxena 31' (o.g.); Chaudhari (yellow card) 47'; Pandita 50'; Uvais (yellow card) 72'	Report	Guarrotxena 38', 90'	Stadium: JRD Tata Sports Complex; Attendance: 13,237; Referee: Umesh Bora; Man of the Match: Iker Guarrotxena (Goa)

3 January 2023 12	Kerala Blasters	3–1	Jamshedpur	Kochi, Kerala
19:30 IST	Giannou 9'; Diamantakos 31' (pen.); Carneiro (yellow card) 45+1'; Singh (yellow card) 54'; Luna 65'	Report	Chukwu 17' (yellow card) 90+6'; Choudhary (yellow card) 90+3'	Stadium: Jawaharlal Nehru Stadium; Attendance: 24,117; Referee: Ashwin; Man of the Match: Adrián Luna (Kerala Blasters)

7 January 2023 13	Jamshedpur	2–2	Chennaiyin	Jamshedpur, Jharkhand
17:30 IST	Das 17', 56'; Halder (yellow card) 30'; Sabiá (yellow card) 33'	Report	Vanspaul (yellow card) 23'; Barretto 60'; Slišković 68'	Stadium: JRD Tata Sports Complex; Attendance: 9,224; Referee: L Priyobarta Singh; Man of the Match: Aakash Sangwan (Chennaiyin)

13 January 2023 14	East Bengal	1–2	Jamshedpur	Kolkata, West Bengal
19:30 IST	Silva 12' (yellow card) 70'; Lima (yellow card) 77'	Report	Sawyer 61'; Chaudhari (yellow card) 66'; Das 85'	Stadium: Vivekananda Yuba Bharati Krirangan; Attendance: 6,758; Referee: Aditya Purkayastha; Man of the Match: Ritwik Das (Jamshedpur)

18 January 2023 15	Jamshedpur	0–3	Bengaluru	Jamshedpur, Jharkhand
19:30 IST	Halder (yellow card) 36'; Sabiá (yellow card) 75'	Report	Kumar 7'; Krishna 34' (yellow card) 53'; Narayanan 62'	Stadium: JRD Tata Sports Complex; Attendance: 9,862; Referee: R Venkatesh; Man of the Match: Sandesh Jhingan (Bengaluru)

27 January 2023 16	Jamshedpur	1–2	Mumbai City	Jamshedpur, Jharkhand
19:30 IST	Halder (yellow card) 45'; Boris 63'	Report	Jahouh (yellow card) 58'; Chhangte 80'; Mehtab (yellow card) 85'; Vikram 86'; Díaz (yellow card) 90+5'	Stadium: JRD Tata Sports Complex; Attendance: 7,430; Referee: Senthil Nathan S Man of the Match: Lallianzuala Chhangte (Mumbai City)

4 February 2023 17	NorthEast United	0–2	Jamshedpur	Guwahati, Assam
19:30 IST	Saji (yellow card) 34'; Gogoi (yellow card) 49'; Shereef (yellow card) 74'	Report	Das 39'; Renthlei (yellow card) 43'; Sabiá (yellow card) 45'; Chukwu 57'	Stadium: Indira Gandhi Athletic Stadium; Attendance: 401; Referee: Pranjal Banerjee; Man of the Match: Rafael Crivellaro (Jamshedpur)

9 February 2023 18	Jamshedpur	0–0	ATK Mohun Bagan	Jamshedpur, Jharkhand
19:30 IST	Jitendra (yellow card) 6'	Report	Bose (yellow card) 40'; Kotal (yellow card) 65'; Kaith (yellow card) 80'	Stadium: JRD Tata Sports Complex; Attendance: 9,669; Referee: Umesh Bora; Man of the Match: Jay Emmanuel-Thomas (Jamshedpur)

18 February 2023 19	Hyderabad	2–3	Jamshedpur	Hyderabad, Telangana
17:30 IST	Ogbeche 12', 79'; Victor (penalty missed)	Report	Das 22'; Emmanuel-Thomas 27' (pen.); Chukwu 29'; Sabiá (red card) 55'; Doungel (yellow card) 87'	Stadium: GMC Balayogi Athletic Stadium; Attendance: 5,276; Referee: Pranjal Banerjee; Man of the Match: Harry Sawyer (Jamshedpur)

22 February 2023 20	Odisha	0–2	Jamshedpur	Bhubaneswar, Odisha
19:30 IST		Report	Chaudhari (yellow card) 52'; Sawyer 61'; Das 63'; N. Barla (yellow card) 67'	Stadium: Kalinga Stadium; Attendance: 6,814; Referee: CR Srikrishna; Man of the Match: Ritwik Das (Jamshedpur)

=== Qualifier for the 2023–24 AFC Champions League group stage slot ===
The winners of the Indian Super League Shield 2021–22 (Jamshedpur FC) and winners of the same in the 2022–23 season (Mumbai City FC) will fight it out in a one-off match on 4 April 2023. The match will be played between the qualifier matches of the Super Cup.

The winners of the game, Mumbai City, got a direct slot in the 2023–24 AFC Champions League group stage for the second time in a row.

4 April 2023	Jamshedpur	1–3	Mumbai City	Manjeri, Kerala
20.30 IST	Chaudhari (yellow card) 41'; Sabiá 80'	Report	Jahouh 53' (pen.) (yellow card) 56'; Noguera 70'; Vikram 90+4' (yellow card) 90+5'	Stadium: Payyanad Stadium; Attendance: 4,423; Referee: Venkatesh R Man of the Match: Alberto Noguera (Mumbai City)

=== Super Cup ===
Jamshedpur were drawn in the Group C for the 3rd edition of the Super Cup along with two other ISL sides.

==== Group stage ====
Pos	Team	Pld	W	D	L	GF	GA	GD	Pts	Qualification	JAM	FCG	AMB	GOK
1	Jamshedpur	3	3	0	0	11	5	+6	9	Advance to knockout stage	—	—	3–0	3–2
2	Goa	3	2	0	1	5	5	0	6		3–5	—	—	—
3	ATK Mohun Bagan	3	1	0	2	5	5	0	3		—	0–1	—	5–1
4	Gokulam Kerala (H)	3	0	0	3	3	9	−6	0		—	1–0	—	—

Source: AIFF
Rules for classification: 1) points; 2) head-to-head points; 3) head-to-head goal difference; 4) goal difference; 5) number of goals scored; 6) drawing of lots
(H) Hosts

==== Matches ====
Win Draw Loss

==== Group stage ====
10 April 2023 1	Goa	3–5	Jamshedpur	Calicut, Kerala
20.30 IST	Sadaoui 6', 70'; Guarrotxena 61'	Report	Chaudhari 11'; Crivellaro 27', 59'; Halder (yellow card) 28'; Arnaout 45+4' (o.g.); Sawyer 82'; Chukwu (yellow card) 90+2'	Stadium: EMS Stadium; Attendance: 2,247; Referee: I Jamal Mohamed; Man of the Match: Rafael Crivellaro (Jamshedpur)

14 April 2023 2	Jamshedpur	3–0	ATK Mohun Bagan	Calicut, Kerala
20.30 IST	Boris 22', 43' (yellow card) 66'; Chukwu (yellow card) 33'; Renthlei (yellow card) 58'; Crivellaro (yellow card) 66'; Sabiá (yellow card) 66'; Sawyer 90+3'	Report	Damjanović (yellow card) 36'; Martins (yellow card) 43'	Stadium: EMS Stadium; Attendance: 2,225; Referee: Tejas Visvasrao Nagvenkar; Man of the Match: Pratik Chaudhari (Jamshedpur)

18 April 2023 3	Jamshedpur	3–2	Gokulam Kerala	Calicut, Kerala
17:00 IST	Sawyer 40'; Choudhary 59'; Pandita 69'	Report	S. Konney 33', 62'; Saini (yellow card) 57'; D'Silva (yellow card) 71'	Stadium: EMS Stadium; Attendance: 1,123; Referee: Senthil Nathan S Man of the Match: Harry Sawyer (Jamshedpur)

==== Semi-finals ====
21 April 2023 SF	Bengaluru	2–0	Jamshedpur	Calicut, Kerala
19:00 IST	Jhingan (yellow card) 53'; Rane 67'; Chhetri 84'	Report	Renthlei (yellow card) 61'	Stadium: EMS Stadium; Attendance: 3,458; Referee: Aditya Purkayastha; Man of the Match: Gurpreet Singh Sandhu (Bengaluru)

== Statistics ==
All stats are correct as of 21 April 2023

=== Squad appearances and goals ===
Note: Jamshedpur fielded their reserve side as their first team for the Durand Cup. As a result, the lists below include the stats of players who featured for the club in different sections of the ISL, Super Cup and the Durand Cup.

==== All competitions ====
No.	Pos	Nat	Player	Total		Indian Super League		Qualifier		Super Cup	
No.	Pos	Nat	Player	Apps	Goals	Apps	Goals	Apps	Goals	Apps	Goals
Goalkeepers
1	GK	(India) IND	Rakshit Dagar	0	0	0	0	0	0	0	0
31	GK	(India) IND	Vishal Yadav	10	0	9	0	0	0	1	0
32	GK	(India) IND	Rehenesh TP	15	0	11	0	1	0	3	0
47	GK	(India) IND	Mohit Dhami	0	0	0	0	0	0	0	0
Defenders
4	DF	(India) IND	Laldinpuia	9	0	4+4	0	0	0	1	0
6	DF	(India) IND	Ricky Lallawmawma	24	0	20	0	1	0	3	0
12	DF	(Australia) AUS	Dylan Fox	0	0	0	0	0	0	0	0
13	DF	(Brazil) BRA	Eli Sabiá	19	1	15	0	1	1	3	0
16	DF	(India) IND	Muhammad Uvais	7	0	3+3	0	0	0	1	0
24	DF	(India) IND	Pratik Chaudhari	22	1	14+3	0	1	0	3+1	1
26	DF	(India) IND	Laldinliana Renthlei	21	0	16+1	0	1	0	3	0
44	DF	(India) IND	Saphaba Singh Telem	0	0	0	0	0	0	0	0
Midfielders
3	MF	(India) IND	Jitendra Singh	17	0	7+6	0	0	0	3+1	0
7	MF	(India) IND	Len Doungel	13	0	0+10	0	0	0	1+2	0
10	MF	(England) ENG	Jay Emmanuel-Thomas	22	2	14+3	2	1	0	3+1	0
14	MF	(India) IND	Pronay Halder	10	0	7	0	1	0	2	0
17	FW	(India) IND	Farukh Choudhary	18	1	6+10	0	0	0	1+1	1
27	MF	(India) IND	Sk Sahil	1	0	1	0	0	0	0	0
28	MF	(India) IND	Germanpreet Singh	6	0	4+1	0	0	0	1	0
50	MF	(Brazil) BRA	Rafael Crivellaro	14	2	9+1	0	0+1	0	3	2
89	MF	(India) IND	Phijam Vikash Singh	4	0	3+1	0	0	0	0	0
Forwards
2	FW	(India) IND	Boris Singh	24	4	18+2	2	1	0	3	2
8	FW	(Australia) AUS	Harry Sawyer	23	5	8+10	2	1	0	1+3	3
9	FW	(India) IND	Ishan Pandita	19	3	6+10	2	0+1	0	1+1	1
11	FW	(India) IND	Komal Thatal	1	0	0	0	0	0	1	0
18	MF	(India) IND	Ritwik Das	23	6	14+4	6	1	0	3+1	0
77	FW	(India) IND	Nikhil Barla	1	0	1	0	0	0	0	0
99	FW	(Nigeria) NGR	Daniel Chima Chukwu	23	5	17+2	5	1	0	3	0
Players who have made an appearance or had a squad number this season but have left the club
5	MF	(Brazil) BRA	Wellington Priori	6	0	5+1	0	0	0	0	0
19	DF	(India) IND	Sandip Mandi	0	0	0	0	0	0	0	0
29	DF	(England) ENG	Peter Hartley	8	1	8	1	0	0	0	0

==== Durand Cup ====
No.	Pos	Nat	Player	Total		Durand Cup	
No.	Pos	Nat	Player	Apps	Goals	Apps	Goals
Goalkeepers
31	GK	(India) IND	Vishal Yadav	0	0	0	0
52	GK	(India) IND	Arman Tamang	0	0	0	0
68	GK	(India) IND	Mohit Dhami	4	0	4	0
Defenders
19	DF	(India) IND	Sandip Mandi	4	0	4	0
44	DF	(India) IND	Rishi Rajput	2	1	0+2	1
58	DF	(India) IND	Kojam Beyong	3	0	3	0
60	DF	(India) IND	Saphaba Singh Telem	4	0	4	0
63	DF	(India) IND	Aryan Sonowal	4	0	4	0
65	DF	(India) IND	Gopal Hembrom	0	0	0	0
66	DF	(India) IND	Raj Mukhi	0	0	0	0
67	DF	(India) IND	Ankit Toppo	0	0	0	0
Midfielders
7	MF	(India) IND	Kamlesh Singh Bist	2	0	1+1	0
34	MF	(India) IND	Deepak Hansda	2	0	0+2	0
45	MF	(India) IND	Anand Kumar	0	0	0	0
46	MF	(India) IND	Keisam Angelo Singh	4	0	4	0
47	MF	(India) IND	Nayan Tamang	0	0	0	0
48	MF	(India) IND	Robin Das	2	0	1+1	0
53	MF	(India) IND	Advait Sumbly	3	0	0+3	0
54	MF	(India) IND	Piyush Thakuri	4	1	3+1	1
59	MF	(India) IND	Sorokhaibam Nongpoknganba Meitei	3	0	0+3	0
61	MF	(India) IND	Phijam Vikash Singh	4	0	4	0
Forwards
55	FW	(India) IND	Hijam Lenin Singh	4	0	3+1	0
62	FW	(India) IND	Lalruatmawia	4	1	4	1
10	FW	(India) IND	Tapan Haldar	3	1	0+3	1
23	FW	(India) IND	Vinil Poojary	4	0	4	0
56	FW	(India) IND	Nikhil Barla	3	0	1+2	0

=== Clean-sheets ===
Rank	Name	No.	League	Durand Cup	Super Cup	Qualifier	Total
1	(India) Rehenesh TP	32	3	0	1	0	4
2	(India) Vishal Yadav	31	1	0	0	0	1
2	(India) Mohit Dhami	47 (Durand Cup: 68)	0	1	0	0	1
