= Ritwik Das =

Indian footballer (born 1996)

Personal information
- Full name: Ritwik Kumar Das
- Date of birth: 14 December 1996 (age 29)
- Place of birth: Burnpur, Asansol, West Bengal, India
- Height: 1.77 m (5 ft 10 in)
- Position: Winger

Team information
- Current team: Odisha

Youth career
- Mohun Bagan

Senior career*
Years	Team	Apps	(Gls)
- Calcutta Customs
2016–2017	Kalighat MS	13	(0)
2017–2020	Real Kashmir	34	(4)
2020–2021	Kerala Blasters	4	(0)
2021–2026	Jamshedpur	59	(12)
2026–	Odisha	0	(0)

International career^{‡}
2023	India	1	(0)
- * Club domestic league appearances and goals as of 18:00, 21 May 2026 (UTC) ‡ National team caps and goals as of 18:00, 23 March 2025

Ritwik Kumar Das (Bengali: ঋত্বিক কুমার দাস; born 14 December 1996) is an Indian professional footballer who plays as a forward for Indian Super League club Odisha.

== Club career ==
=== Early years ===
Ritwik gave his first trial at a Mohun Bagan non-residential academy when he was in ninth grade where he learnt the nuances of football.

He began his professional journey with Calcutta Customs in the CFL First Division before switching to Kalighat MS in 2016 where they played in the Calcutta Premier Division Group B.

Ritwik's time of reckoning arrived when Real Kashmir FC decided to hold trials at a Sports Authority of India ground in West Bengal in 2017. After impressing the club management, he signed a contract and represented them in the 2017–18 I-League 2nd Division.

=== Real Kashmir ===
He made his I-League debut for Real Kashmir on 11 December 2018 at EMS Stadium against Shillong Lajong, he was brought in as substitute in 77th minute as they won 6–1. He evolved as a highly rated winger at the club.

=== Kerala Blasters ===
On 15 July 2020, RitwikDas joined Indian Super League club Kerala Blasters. He made his debut on 20 November against ATK Mohun Bagan in the season opener. He played 4 matches throughout campaign and left the club at the end of the season.

=== Jamshedpur ===
On 21 October 2021, Ritwik Das joined Jamshedpur on a one-year deal, with an option to extend for another year. On 26 November, he made his debut as a substitute for Seiminlen Doungel in a 1–3 away league win over Goa. On 17 February 2022, he scored his first Indian Super League goal against Mumbai City. He scored 4 goals in 17 appearances and won the 2021–22 Indian Super League League Winners Shield with the club.

== International ==
On 24 May 2022, Das was called up to the Indian senior squad for the first time ahead of their friendly against Jordan. However, he suffered an injury, due to which he withdrew after a brief stint in the camp.

On 14 March 2023, Das was recalled to the senior squad in Kolkata, after almost a year. He made his debut against Myanmar on 22 March, replacing Anirudh Thapa after 87 minutes in a 1–0 victory.

== Career statistics ==
=== Club ===
As of 22 May 2023

Appearances and goals by club, season and competition
Club	Season	League			Cup		Continental		Total	
Club	Season	Division	Apps	Goals	Apps	Goals	Apps	Goals	Apps	Goals
Real Kashmir	2017–18	I-League 2nd Division	13	4	0	0	—		13	4
Real Kashmir	2018–19	I-League	10	0	1 (Note: Appearances in Super Cup)	0	—		11	0
Real Kashmir	2019–20	I-League	11	0	4 (Note: Appearances in Durand Cup)	0	—		15	0
Real Kashmir	Total		34	4	5	0	—		39	4
Kerala Blasters	2020–21	Indian Super League	4	0	0	0	—		4	0
Jamshedpur	2021–22	Indian Super League	17	4	0	0	—		17	4
Jamshedpur	2022–23	Indian Super League	18	6	4	0	1 (Note: Appearance in Appearance in playoff for AFC Champions League)	0	23	6
Jamshedpur	Total		35	10	4	0	1	0	40	10
Career total			73	14	9	0	1	0	83	14

=== International ===
As of 22 March 2023

National team	Year	Apps	Goals
India	2023	1	0
Total		1	0

== Honours ==
Jamshedpur

- Indian Super League League Winners Shield: 2021–22

India

- Tri-Nation Series: 2023
