= Farukh Choudhary =

Indian footballer (born 1996)

Personal information
- Full name: Farukh Haji Kasam Choudhary
- Date of birth: 8 November 1996 (age 30)
- Place of birth: Ambarnath, Maharashtra, India
- Height: 1.80 m (5 ft 11 in)
- Position: Winger

Team information
- Current team: Mumbai City
- Number: 7

Youth career
- Central Bank
- Pune

Senior career*
Years	Team	Apps	(Gls)
2015–2016	Lonestar Kashmir	18	(6)
2016	Kerala Blasters	2	(0)
2017	→ Mumbai (loan)	10	(0)
2017–2020	Jamshedpur	44	(3)
2020–2021	Mumbai City	6	(0)
2021–2023	Jamshedpur	24	(0)
2023–2026	Chennaiyin	50	(4)
2026–	Mumbai City	0	(0)

International career^{‡}
2018−	India	25	(3)
Medal record
Men's football
Representing India
SAFF Championship
Winner	2021 Maldives
- * Club domestic league appearances and goals as of 12:00, 1 October 2026 (UTC) ‡ National team caps and goals as of 22:00, 3 October 2026 (UTC)

Farukh Haji Kasam Choudhary (born 8 November 1996) is an Indian professional footballer who plays as a winger for Indian Super League club Mumbai City and the India national team.

== Early career ==
Encouraged by his father to take on football, Choudhary started his career as a centre back with the Maharashtra state youth teams. Choudhary then joined the academy of I-League side Pune.

== Club career ==
=== Lonestar Kashmir ===
Choudhary joined Lonestar Kashmir for their I-League 2nd Division campaign. There he scored six goals in a total of 8 matches.

=== Kerala Blasters ===
After an impressive performance for Lonestar Kashmir, Choudhary signed for Kerala Blasters of the Indian Super League. He made his professional debut with the club on 5 October 2016 against Atlético de Kolkata. He started the match and played 68 minutes as Mumbai City FC lost 1–0.

==== Mumbai (loan) ====
After the 2016 ISL season, Choudhary was loaned to I-League side Mumbai. He made his debut for the club on 8 January 2017 in their opening match of the season against DSK Shivajians. He started and played 56 minutes as Mumbai won 1–0.

=== Jamshedpur ===
On 23 July 2017, Choudhary was selected in the 11th round of the 2017–18 ISL Players Draft by Jamshedpur for the 2017–18 Indian Super League. He made his debut for the club during the first ever match on 18 November 2017 against NorthEast United. He came as a 69th-minute substitute for Mehtab Hossain as Jamshedpur drew 0–0.

== Career statistics ==
=== Club ===
As of match played 1 October 2024

Appearances and goals by club, season and competition
Club	Season	League			Super Cup		Durand Cup		AFC		Total	
Club	Season	Division	Apps	Goals	Apps	Goals	Apps	Goals	Apps	Goals	Apps	Goals
Lonestar Kashmir	2015–16	I-League 2nd Division	18	6	—		—		—		18	6
Kerala Blasters	2016	Indian Super League	2	0	—		—		—		2	0
Mumbai	2016–17	I-League	10	0	0	0	—		—		10	0
Jamshedpur	2017–18	Indian Super League	15	0	2	0	—		—		17	0
Jamshedpur	2018–19	Indian Super League	12	2	1	0	—		—		13	2
Jamshedpur	2019–20	Indian Super League	17	1	0	0	—		—		17	1
Jamshedpur	Total		44	3	3	0	0	0	0	0	47	3
Mumbai City	2020–21	Indian Super League	6	0	0	0	0	0	—		6	0
Jamshedpur	2020–21	Indian Super League	8	0	0	0	0	0	—		8	0
Jamshedpur	2021–22	Indian Super League	0	0	0	0	0	0	—		0	0
Jamshedpur	2022–23	Indian Super League	16	0	2	1	0	0	—		18	1
Jamshedpur	Total		24	0	2	1	0	0	0	0	26	1
Chennaiyin	2023–24	Indian Super League	19	1	1	0	3	1	—		23	2
Chennaiyin	2024–25	Indian Super League	3	2	0	0	0	0	—		3	2
Chennaiyin	Total		22	3	1	0	3	1	0	0	26	4
Career total			126	12	6	1	3	1	0	0	135	14

=== International ===
As of 3 October 2026

National team	Year	Apps	Goals
India	2018	5	0
India	2019	5	0
India	2021	4	1
India	2024	2	1
India	2024	4	0
India	2025	0	0
India	2026	5	1
Total		25	3

India score listed first, score column indicates score after each Choudhary goal

List of international goals scored by Farukh Choudhary
No.	Date	Venue	Cap	Opponent	Score	Result	Competition	Ref.
1.	5 September 2021	Dasharath Rangasala, Kathmandu, Nepal	11	Nepal	1–0	2–1	Friendly	
2.	12 October 2024	Thiên Trường Stadium, Nam Định, Vietnam	15	Vietnam	1–1	1–1	Friendly	
3.	5 June 2026	TALCO Arena, Tursunzoda, Tajikistan	23	Tajikistan	1–3	1–3	Friendly	

== Honours ==
India

- SAFF Championship: 2021, 2026; runner-up: 2018
- King's Cup third place: 2019

Jamshedpur

- Indian Super League Premiers: 2021–22
