= Irfan Yadwad =

Indian footballer (born 2001)

Personal information
- Full name: Irfan Yadwad
- Date of birth: 19 June 2001 (age 25)
- Place of birth: Goa, India
- Height: 1.83 m (6 ft 0 in)
- Position: Forward

Team information
- Current team: Chennaiyin
- Number: 19

Youth career
- 2018–2020: SC de Goa

Senior career*
Years	Team	Apps	(Gls)
2021–2022	Panjim Footballers	36	(18)
2022–2023	Bengaluru United	16	(14)
2023–	Chennaiyin	43	(8)
2024	Chennaiyin B	2	(2)

International career^{‡}
2024–	India	7	(0)
Medal record
Representing India
CAFA Nations Cup
Third place	2025 Tajikistan–Uzbekistan	Team
- * Club domestic league appearances and goals as of 16:30, 9 March 2025 (UTC) ‡ National team caps and goals as of 22:00, 8 September 2025 (UTC)

Irfan Yadwad (born 19 June 2001) is an Indian professional footballer who plays as a forward for Indian Super League club Chennaiyin and the India national team.

== International career ==
After his performances for Chennaiyin FC in the Indian Super League, Yadwad was selected for the senior national team by head coach Manolo Márquez. On 5 November 2024, Yadwad was included in India's 26-member probable squad for a friendly against Malaysia. On 18 November 2024, he made his international debut in a 1–1 draw against Malaysia. In 2025, Yadwad represented India during the 2025 CAFA Nations Cup and 2027 AFC Asian Cup qualification matches.

== Personal life ==
Yadwad was born in South Goa. His father works as a carptener and was a former footballer himself, but he only played in local tournaments.

In 2019, Yadwad endured a meniscus injury in a local tournament in Chandor, Goa. He was out for three months and was asked to contemplate quitting the sport but he recovered from the injury, thanks to relentless support from his father.

== Honours ==
Panjim Footballers

- Goa Police Cup: 2021

FC Bengaluru United

- Stafford Challenge Cup: 2023

India

- SAFF Championship: 2026

Individual

- Stafford Challenge Cup Top Scorer: 2023
- Indian Super League Emerging Player of the Month for March 2025

== Career statistics ==
=== Club ===
As of 11 December 2024

Club	Season	League			National Cup		League Cup		AFC		Total	
Club	Season	Division	Apps	Goals	Apps	Goals	Apps	Goals	Apps	Goals	Apps	Goals
Bengaluru United	2022–23	I-League 2	11	13	—		—		—		11	13
Chennaiyin	2023–24	Indian Super League	17	1	3 (Note: Appearance(s) in Super Cup)	1	3 (Note: Appearance(s) in Durand Cup)	0	—		23	2
Chennaiyin	2024–25	Indian Super League	12	2	—		3	0	—		15	2
Chennaiyin	Total		29	3	3	1	6	0	0	0	38	4
Chennaiyin B	2024	RFDL	2	0	—		—		—		2	0
Career total			42	16	3	1	6	0	0	0	51	17

=== International ===
As of 8 September 2025

National team	Year	Apps	Goals
India	2024	1	0
India	2025	6	0
Total		7	0
