= Prateek Kumar Singh =

Indian footballer

Personal information
- Date of birth: 27 January 2000 (age 26)
- Place of birth: Chandigarh, India
- Height: 1.88 m (6 ft 2 in)
- Position: Goalkeeper

Team information
- Current team: Kannur Warriors FC
- Number: 27

Youth career
- 2018–2019: ATK B

Senior career*
Years	Team	Apps	(Gls)
2019–2021	Chennai City	4	(0)
2021–2022	NEROCA	6	(0)
2022–2023	Real Kashmir	3	(0)
2023–2025	Chennaiyin	0	(0)
2024–2025	→ Dempo (loan)	0	(0)
2025–2026	Thrissur Magic		
- * Club domestic league appearances and goals ‡ National team caps and goals as of 11 March 2023

Prateek Kumar Singh (born 27 January 2000) is an Indian professional footballer who plays as a goalkeeper.

== Club career ==
Born in Chandigarh, Singh is a product of Raman Vijayan Soccer School and has represented ATK at youth level. He began his professional career with I-League club Chennai City. He made his debut for the club on 28 February 2021 against Aizawl. He came on as a 12th-minute substitute after Chennai City's starting goalkeeper, Kabir Thaufiq, was red carded. Chennai City would go on to lose the match 3–0.

On 6 July 2023, Chennaiyin roped in Singh ahead of the upcoming season. This was his first outing in the Indian Super League.

== Career statistics ==
=== Club ===
As of 11 March 2023

Club	Season	League			Cup		AFC		Total	
Club	Season	Division	Apps	Goals	Apps	Goals	Apps	Goals	Apps	Goals
Chennai City	2020–21	I-League	4	0	2 (Note: Appearance(s) in Durand Cup)	0	—		6	0
NEROCA	2021–22	I-League	6	0	0	0	—		6	0
Real Kashmir	2022–23	I-League	3	0	0	0	—		3	0
Chennaiyin	2023–24	Indian Super League	0	0	0	0	—		0	0
Career total			13	0	2	0	0	0	15	0
