= Edwin Sydney Vanspaul =

Indian footballer

Edwin Vanspaul
Personal information
- Full name: Edwin Sydney Vanspaul Henry
- Date of birth: 24 September 1992 (age 34)
- Place of birth: Neyveli, Tamil Nadu, India
- Height: 1.70 m (5 ft 7 in)
- Positions: Midfielder; right-back

Team information
- Current team: Odisha

Youth career
- 2009–2010: Indian Bank RC

Senior career*
Years	Team	Apps	(Gls)
2010–2013	Indian Bank RC	28	(3)
2014–2015	Chennai FC	22	(9)
2016–2019	Chennai City	50	(8)
2019–2023	Chennaiyin	71	(1)
2023–2024	East Bengal	4	(0)
2024–2025	Chennaiyin	1	(0)
2026–	Odisha	2	(0)
- * Club domestic league appearances and goals as of 17 October 2026

Edwin Sydney Vanspaul Henry (born 24 September 1992) is an Indian professional footballer who plays as a midfielder or defender for Indian Super League club Odisha.

== Early career ==
Son of a sports enthusiast, Edwin Sydney grew up watching his father play one or another game daily. But football attracted him the most, and since his 5th grade, he started playing football. Unfortunately, Edwin failed to clear his 12th exam and joined Loyola College, Chennai. Chennai Football Association (CFA) senior division team Indian Bank used to train at Loyola College, and Edwin got an opportunity to train with the team, soon they signed him for CFA senior division league.

== Career ==
=== Indian Bank ===
Edwin made his debut in CFA senior division in 2010 when he started and played as a striker against Central Excise. Indian Bank won the game three goals to nil. The Neyveli born footballer went on to score 3 goals in 28 appearances for Indian Bank during 2010–2013, before he moved to Chennai FC.

=== Chennai FC ===
Edwin shifted to central midfield at Chennai FC, and debuted in the game against Indian Arrows which Chennai FC went on to win 3–0. The midfielder went on to score 6 goals in 22 appearances for Chennai FC during 2014–2015 season.

=== Chennai City ===
Edwin joined Chennai City in 2016, where he played as a winger primarily. He scored 8 goals in 22 appearances in the CFA Senior Division league between 2016 and 2017.

In 2016 Chennai City entered I-league as direct entrants, and signed Edwin soon after. On 21 January 2017 Vanspaul made his professional debut in the I-League for Chennai City against Mohun Bagan. He started and played 68 minutes as Chennai City lost 2–1. Edwin went on to play 12 games during the season in total. In 2017-18 I-League season, under V. Soundararajan, Edwin's position was constantly shifted from central midfield to left back or right wing. Despite the poor performance of the team, Edwin caught the eye with his accurate passing ability.

In 2018–19 season, he was integral in helping Chennai City win their maiden I-League title. Edwins's performance was highly praised and helped him gain interest from many ISL clubs.

=== Chennaiyin ===
In the 2019 Summer Transfer Window, former Indian Super League champions and his home state club Chennaiyin signed him permanently. He would play 20 times during the season, primarily as a right back and in center midfield later in the season due to the emergence of Laldinliana Renthlei. He left Chennaiyin at the end of 2022–23 season, after making 71 appearances.

=== East Bengal ===
Vanspaul joined East Bengal for 2023–24 season on a free transfer, he made 4 league appearances. He left East Bengal at the end of the season.

=== Return to Chennaiyin ===
He joined Chennaiyin for the second time on a free transfer. He made one appearance throughout his second stint. Vanspaul left at the end of the season.

== Career statistics ==
=== Club ===
As of 9 March 2025

Club	Season	League			National Cup		League Cup		AFC		Total	
Club	Season	Division	Apps	Goals	Apps	Goals	Apps	Goals	Apps	Goals	Apps	Goals
Chennai City	2016–17	I-League	12	0	0	0	3 (Note: Appearance(s) in Federation Cup)	2	—		15	2
Chennai City	2017–18	I-League	18	0	0	0	1 (Note: Appearance(s) in Super Cup)	0	—		19	0
Chennai City	2018–19	I-League	20	0	0	0	3	0	—		23	0
Chennai City	Total		50	0	0	0	7	2	0	0	57	2
Chennaiyin	2019–20	Indian Super League	20	0	0	0	0	0	—		20	0
Chennaiyin	2020–21	Indian Super League	14	0	0	0	0	0	—		14	0
Chennaiyin	2021–22	Indian Super League	18	0	0	0	0	0	—		18	0
Chennaiyin	2022–23	Indian Super League	19	1	4 (Note: Appearance(s) in Durand Cup)	1	3	1	—		26	3
Chennaiyin	Total		71	1	4	1	3	1	0	0	78	3
East Bengal	2023–24	Indian Super League	4	0	4	0	1	0	—		9	0
Chennaiyin	2024–25	Indian Super League	1	0	—		0	0	—		1	0
Odisha	2025–26	Indian Super League	0	0	—		0	0	—		0	0
Career total			126	1	8	1	11	3	0	0	145	5

== Honours ==
=== Club ===
Chennai City

- I-League: 2018–19

Chennaiyin

- Indian Super League: runner-up 2019–20
