= Lukas Brambilla =

Brazilian footballer

Personal information
- Full name: Lukas Pivetta Brambilla
- Date of birth: 4 January 1995 (age 31)
- Place of birth: Caxias do Sul, Brazil
- Height: 1.80 m (5 ft 11 in)
- Position: Attacking midfielder

Team information
- Current team: Java United
- Number: 10

Youth career
- –2014: Juventude
- 2015–2016: Náutico
- 2016: Igrejinha

Senior career*
Years	Team	Apps	(Gls)
2017	Guarany Bagé	12	(1)
2017–2018	Krymteplytsia Molodizhne	13	(2)
2018	Kajaani	17	(2)
2019	Apollon Larissa	15	(6)
2019–2020	Doxa Katokopias	13	(0)
2020–2021	Chania	22	(3)
2021–2022	Anagennisi Karditsa	18	(3)
2022–2023	Mesaimeer SC	10	(2)
2023	Botev Vratsa	6	(0)
2023–2024	Othellos Athienou	34	(6)
2024–2025	Chennaiyin	22	(4)
2025–2026	Al-Fahaheel		
2026–	Java United	5	(2)
- * Club domestic league appearances and goals as of 30 October 2026

Lukas Pivetta Brambilla (born 4 January 1995) is a Brazilian professional footballer who plays as an attacking midfielder for Super League club Java United.

== Career statistics ==
=== Club ===
As of 7 December 2019.

Club	Season	League			Cup		Continental		Other		Total	
Club	Season	Division	Apps	Goals	Apps	Goals	Apps	Goals	Apps	Goals	Apps	Goals
Guarany Bagé	2017	–			0	0	–		12 (Note: Appearances in the Campeonato Gaúcho Acesso)	1	12	1
Krymteplytsia Molodizhne	2017–2018	Crimean Premier League	13	2	3	1 (Note: Appearances in the CFU Cup)	–		0	0	16	3
Kajaani	2018	Ykkönen	17	2	1 (Note: Appearances in the Finnish Cup)	0	–		0	0	18	2
Apollon Larissa	2018–19	Football League	15	6	0	0	–		0	0	15	6
Doxa Katokopias	2019–20	Cypriot First Division	9	0	0	0	–		0	0	9	0
Career total			54	10	4	1	0	0	12	1	70	12
