= Rafael Crivellaro =

Brazilian footballer

Personal information
- Full name: Rafael Schuler Crivellaro
- Date of birth: 18 February 1989 (age 37)
- Place of birth: Porto Alegre, Brazil
- Height: 1.83 m (6 ft 0 in)
- Position: Attacking midfielder

Youth career
- 2007: Internacional
- 2007−2009: Empoli

Senior career*
Years	Team	Apps	(Gls)
2009	Caxias	10	(1)
2010	Guaratinguetá	9	(0)
2011−2015	Vitória Guimarães	41	(3)
2011–2012	→ Trofense (loan)	23	(1)
2012−2015	Vitória Guimarães B	24	(15)
2015	Ajman Club	13	(5)
2015−2016	Wisła Kraków	20	(3)
2015−2016	Wisła Kraków II	5	(2)
2016−2017	Arouca	24	(3)
2017−2018	Sepahan	5	(0)
2018–2019	Feirense	31	(1)
2019–2022	Chennaiyin	27	(8)
2022–2023	Jamshedpur	10	(0)
2023–2024	Chennaiyin	22	(4)
- * Club domestic league appearances and goals as of 16:46, 20 April 2024 (UTC)

Rafael Schuler Crivellaro (born 18 February 1989) is a Brazilian professional footballer who plays as an attacking midfielder.

== Career ==
Born in Porto Alegre, Crivellaro youth development was spent at Internacional and Empoli. In 2009, he joined, Sociedade Esportiva e Recreativa Caxias do Sul competing in the third tier. From there, he moved to Guaratinguetá making his professional debut on 19 October 2010 in a match against Icasa.

Crivellaro joined Vitória Guimarães in January 2011, being loaned to Trofense for the 2011-12 season on 26 August 2011. The following year, he returned to Guimarães, competing in their first team, but also having short stints in their reserve side, winning an award in November 2014 for SJPF Segunda Liga Player of the Month.

On 28 January 2015, Crivellaro moved to the Ajman Club, which was managed at the time by Manuel Cajuda. Not even six months later, on 24 June 2015, he moved to Poland, joining Wisła Kraków.

Crivellaro joined Primeira Liga club Arouca on a two-year contract on 17 June 2016.

On 3 September 2019, Crivellaro penned a deal with Chennaiyin as their latest foreign recruit. Crivellaro was appointed as captain of Chennaiyin FC in November 2020 ahead of the 2020–21 Indian Super League season. Later he was ruled out of the rest of the season due to an ankle injury. On 16 July 2021, Chennayin FC announced that they have extended the contract of Crivellaro on a multi-year deal.

On 7 December 2022, Crivellaro joined Indian Super League rivals Jamshedpur on a contract until the end of the 2022–23 season.

== Career statistics ==
As of match played 20 April 2024

Appearances and goals by club, season and competition
Club	Season	League			National cup (Note: Includes Taça de Portugal, Polish Cup, Super Cup)		State league		League cup (Note: Includes Taça da Liga)		Continental		Other		Total	
Club	Season	Division	Apps	Goals	Apps	Goals	Apps	Goals	Apps	Goals	Apps	Goals	Apps	Goals	Apps	Goals
Caxias	2009	Série C	1	0	0	0	9 (Note: Appearance(s) in Campeonato Gaúcho)	1	—		—		—		10	1
Guaratinguetá	2010	Série B	7	0	0	0	2 (Note: Appearance(s) in Campeonato Paulista Série A2)	0	—		—		—		9	0
Vitória de Guimarães	2010–11	Primeira Liga	2	0	0	0	—		1	0	—		—		3	0
Vitória de Guimarães	2012–13	Primeira Liga	14	0	4	0	—		1	1	—		—		19	1
Vitória de Guimarães	2013–14	Primeira Liga	20	3	1	0	—		2	0	1 (Note: Appearance(s) in UEFA Europa League)	0	1 (Note: Appearance(s) in Supertaça Cândido de Oliveira)	0	25	3
Vitória de Guimarães	2014–15	Primeira Liga	5	0	1	0	—		1	0	—		—		7	0
Vitória de Guimarães	Total		41	3	6	0	—		5	1	1	0	1	0	54	4
Trofense (loan)	2011–12	Liga Portugal 2	23	1	0	0	—		—		—		—		23	1
Vitória Guimarães B	2012–13	Liga Portugal 2	10	2	0	0	—		—		—		—		10	2
Vitória Guimarães B	2014–15	Liga Portugal 2	14	13	0	0	—		—		—		—		14	13
Vitória Guimarães B	Total		24	15	0	0	—		—		—		—		24	15
Ajman Club	2014–15	UAE Pro League	13	5	0	0	—		—		—		—		13	5
Wisła Kraków	2015–16	Ekstraklasa	20	3	1	0	—		—		—		—		21	3
Wisła Kraków II	2015–16	III liga	5	2	—		—		—		—		—		5	2
Arouca	2016–17	Primeira Liga	24	3	0	0	—		4	1	4	0	—		32	4
Sepahan	2017–18	Gulf Pro League	5	0	—		—		—		—		—		5	0
Feirense	2017–18	Liga Portugal 2	11	1	—		—		—		—		—		11	1
Feirense	2018–19	Liga Portugal 2	20	0	2	0	—		3	0	—		—		25	0
Feirense	Total		31	1	2	0	—		3	0	—		—		36	1
Chennaiyin	2019–20	Indian Super League	20	7	—		—		—		—		—		20	7
Chennaiyin	2020–21	Indian Super League	7	1	—		—		—		—		—		7	1
Chennaiyin	Total		27	8	—		—		—		—		—		27	8
Jamshedpur	2022–23	Indian Super League	10	0	3	2	—		—		—		1 (Note: Appearance(s) in play-offs for AFC Champions League)	0	14	2
Chennaiyin	2023–24	Indian Super League	22	4	2	0	—		—		—		3 (Note: Appearance(s) in Durand Cup)	2	27	6
Career total			253	45	14	2	11	1	12	2	5	0	5	2	300	52

== Honours ==
Vitória de Guimarães

- Taça de Portugal: 2012–13

Chennaiyin

- Indian Super League runner-up: 2019–20

Individual

- SJPF Segunda Liga Player of the Month: November 2014
