= Ryan Edwards (English footballer) =

English footballer (born 1993)

Personal information
- Full name: Ryan Christopher Edwards
- Date of birth: 7 October 1993 (age 33)
- Place of birth: Halewood, Liverpool, England
- Height: 1.95 m (6 ft 5 in)
- Position: Centre-back

Team information
- Current team: Sporting JAX
- Number: 15

Youth career
- 2010–2012: Blackburn Rovers

Senior career*
Years	Team	Apps	(Gls)
2012–2014	Blackburn Rovers	0	(0)
2012–2013	→ Rochdale (loan)	26	(0)
2013	→ Fleetwood Town (loan)	9	(0)
2013	→ Chesterfield (loan)	5	(0)
2013	→ Tranmere Rovers (loan)	0	(0)
2014	→ Morecambe (loan)	9	(0)
2014–2017	Morecambe	111	(2)
2017–2019	Plymouth Argyle	61	(8)
2019–2020	Blackpool	21	(1)
2020–2023	Dundee United	86	(8)
2023–2025	Chennaiyin	42	(3)
2025–2026	Falkirk	4	(0)
2026–	Sporting JAX	23	(0)
- * Club domestic league appearances and goals as of 2 November 2026

Ryan Christopher Edwards (born 7 October 1993) is an English professional footballer who plays as a defender for USL Championship club Sporting JAX.

== Career ==
=== Blackburn Rovers ===
Born in Liverpool, Edwards started a two-year scholarship with Blackburn Rovers in 2010. He was captain of the Blackburn squad that reached the final of the 2011–12 FA Youth Cup. Following this, in May 2012, Edwards signed his first professional contract on a two-year deal.

Despite being determined to make a breakthrough under the management of Gary Bowyer, Edwards was among sixteen players to be released by the club at the end of the 2013–14 season.

==== Loan moves ====
On 2 July 2012, Edwards joined League Two side Rochdale on a six-month loan. He made his Rochdale debut in the first round of the League Cup, in a 4–3 loss against Barnsley. and he also made his league debut, in the opening game of the season, in a goalless draw against Northampton Town. Having made 26 league appearances for Rochdale, Edwards returned to his parent club after the club's management decided not to extend his loan spell.

Following his time at Rochdale, Edwards had been linked to sign on loan for the second half of the season. On 21 February 2013, he joined Fleetwood Town on a one-month loan. He made his debut for the club two days later, in a 2–0 loss against Aldershot Town. After making four appearances for the club, his loan spell with Fleetwood Town was extended until the end of the season. Edward went on to make nine appearances for the club before returning to Blackburn Rovers.

On 24 July 2013, Edwards joined Chesterfield on a one-month loan deal. Upon the move, the club's first-team coach Keith Lynch believed Edwards could be a "good asset". Edwards made a starting debut for the club in the opening game of the season, a 2–0 win over Bury. His performances throughout the pre-season and at the start of the season led to Chesterfield extending Edwards' loan spell for two months. Edwards featured less in the first team, and then on 24 October 2013 he returned to Ewood Park.

On 28 November 2013, Edwards joined Tranmere Rovers on loan until 29 December 2013; however, he made his only appearance for the club in the second round of the FA Cup, in a 5–0 defeat to Peterborough United. After his loan spell at Tranmere Rovers came to an end, manager Ronnie Moore explained his decision not including Edwards, stating: "It is not ideal for a young kid to be coming into the side with the way we are playing at the moment."

=== Morecambe ===
On 21 March 2014, Edwards joined League Two side Morecambe on a one-month youth loan. The next day, he made his debut in a 1–1 draw against Northampton Town. Edwards' seven appearances for the club led, on 24 April 2014, to the extension of his loan stay with the Shrimps until the end of the 2013–14 season. He went on to make nine appearances for the club.

After a successful loan spell at the Globe Arena towards the end of the 2013–14 season, Edwards signed a two-year deal after being released by Blackburn Rovers on 19 May 2014; however, at the start of the season, Edwards fractured his fingers in a friendly match, which kept him out for two months. Throughout August, Edwards started to maintain his fitness after surgery. Edwards' first game after signing for the club on a permanent basis, as well as coming from injury, came in a goalless draw against Cheltenham Town on 6 September 2014. Edwards continued to be in the first team, although he spent six games on the substitutes bench.

Edwards was sent off on 7 March 2015, in a 3–2 win over Luton Town. After making his return against Shrewsbury Town on 17 March 2015, he provided an assist for Kevin Ellison in a 1–1 draw against Accrington Stanley on 3 April 2015. Edwards ended his first full season at Morecambe with 31 appearances after suffering a back injury.

Edwards scored his first career goal in a 2–0 win over Portsmouth on 16 August 2016.

=== Plymouth Argyle ===
On 13 June 2017, Plymouth Argyle announced Edwards as their third signing of the summer, from Morecambe.

He was offered a new contract by Plymouth Argyle at the end of the 2018–19 season.

=== Blackpool ===
On 14 June 2019, Edwards signed a two-year contract with Blackpool, marking a return to his native North West.

He made his debut for the Seasiders in their opening fixture of the 2019–20 season, a 2–0 victory over Bristol Rovers at Bloomfield Road.

=== Dundee United ===
On 3 August 2020, Edwards signed for Scottish club Dundee United.

=== Chennaiyin ===
Following his release from Dundee United, Edwards joined Chennaiyin in the Indian Super League.

=== Falkirk ===
On 4 November 2025, Falkirk announced that they had signed Edwards to a short-term deal.

=== Sporting JAX ===
In 2026, he joined USL Championship expansion franchise Sporting JAX for their inaugural season.

== Personal life ==
Edwards survived testicular cancer after treatment only three months after being diagnosed with the disease.

== Career statistics ==
As of match played 23 April 2025

Appearances and goals by club, season and competition
Club	Season	League			FA Cup		League Cup		Other		Total	
Club	Season	Division	Apps	Goals	Apps	Goals	Apps	Goals	Apps	Goals	Apps	Goals
Blackburn Rovers	2012–13	Championship	0	0	0	0	0	0	0	0	0	0
Blackburn Rovers	2013–14	Championship	0	0	0	0	0	0	0	0	0	0
Blackburn Rovers	Total		0	0	0	0	0	0	0	0	0	0
Rochdale (loan)	2012–13	League Two	26	0	1	0	1	0	1 (Note: Appearances in the EFL Trophy)	0	29	0
Fleetwood Town (loan)	2012–13	League Two	9	0	0	0	0	0	0	0	9	0
Chesterfield (loan)	2013–14	League Two	5	0	0	0	1	0	1	0	7	0
Tranmere Rovers	2013–14	League One	0	0	1	0	0	0	0	0	1	0
Morecambe (loan)	2013–14	League Two	9	0	0	0	0	0	0	0	9	0
Morecambe	2014–15	League Two	31	0	1	0	0	0	2	0	34	0
Morecambe	2015–16	League Two	37	0	2	0	1	0	3	0	43	0
Morecambe	2016–17	League Two	43	1	1	0	2	0	4	1	50	2
Morecambe	Total		111	1	4	0	3	0	9	1	127	2
Plymouth Argyle	2017–18	League One	25	3	2	0	1	0	2	1	30	4
Plymouth Argyle	2018–19	League One	36	5	0	0	1	0	1	0	38	5
Plymouth Argyle	Total		61	8	2	0	2	0	3	1	68	9
Blackpool	2019–20	League One	21	1	2	0	1	0	3	0	27	1
Dundee United	2020–21	Scottish Premiership	24	2	4	1	4	1	0	0	32	4
Dundee United	2021–22	Scottish Premiership	36	4	3	0	5	0	0	0	44	4
Dundee United	2022–23	Scottish Premiership	32	0	0	0	2	0	2	0	36	0
Dundee United	Total		92	6	7	1	11	1	2	0	112	8
Chennaiyin	2023–24	Indian Super League	22	2	3	0	0	0	0	0	25	2
Chennaiyin	2024–25	Indian Super League	20	1	1	0	0	0	0	0	21	1
Chennaiyin	Total		42	3	4	0	0	0	0	0	46	3
Career total			376	19	21	1	19	1	19	2	435	23
