= Jiteshwor Singh Yumkhaibam =

Indian footballer (born 2001)

Jiteshwor Singh
Personal information
- Full name: Jiteshwor Singh Yumkhaibam
- Date of birth: 10 December 2001 (age 24)
- Place of birth: Manipur, India
- Position: Defensive midfielder

Team information
- Current team: Chennaiyin
- Number: 37

Youth career
- Eastern Sporting Union
- Rising Athletic Union

Senior career*
Years	Team	Apps	(Gls)
2019–2022	NEROCA	37	(0)
2020	→ Bhawanipore (loan)	3	(0)
2022–	Chennaiyin	44	(0)

International career^{‡}
2023	India U23	2	(0)
- * Club domestic league appearances and goals as of 23:33, 19 February 2026 (UTC) ‡ National team caps and goals as of 20:33, 12 September 2023 (UTC)

Jiteshwor Singh Yumkhaibam (Meitei: Yumkhaibam Jiteshwor Singh, born 10 December 2001) is an Indian professional footballer who plays as a midfielder for Indian Super League club Chennaiyin.

== Club career ==
=== NEROCA ===
In July 2019, Jiteshwor joined NEROCA ahead of the upcoming I-League season. On 8 January 2020, he made his professional debut for the club in the 7th matchweek of the 2019–20 I-League campaign against TRAU, in a 2–1 loss. On 11 July 2021, Jiteshwor extended his contract with NEROCA for the 2021–22 season.

=== Chennaiyin ===
In June 2022, Indian Super League club Chennaiyin roped in Jiteshwor on a two-year deal. On 20 August, he made his debut against Army Red in the Durand Cup, which ended in a 2–2 draw. On 14 October, he was awarded the Hero of the Match for his performance against Bengaluru in the Indian Super League, which ended in a 1–1 stalemate.

== Career statistics ==
=== Club ===
As of 24 February 2023

Club	Season	League			Cup		AFC		Total	
Club	Season	Division	Apps	Goals	Apps	Goals	Apps	Goals	Apps	Goals
NEROCA	2019–20	I-League	8	0	0	0	–		8	0
NEROCA	2020–21	I-League	12	0	0	0	–		12	0
NEROCA	2021–22	I-League	17	0	0	0	–		17	0
NEROCA	NEROCA total		37	0	0	0	0	0	37	0
Bhawanipore (loan)	2020	I-League 2nd Division	3	0	0	0	–		3	0
Chennaiyin	2022–23	Indian Super League	16	0	2 (Note: Appearance(s) in Durand Cup)	0	–		18	0
Career total			56	0	2	0	0	0	58	0
