= Chennaiyin FC =

Association football club in India

Chennaiyin
- Full name: Chennaiyin Football Club
- Nickname: Marina Machans (The Sea Blues)
- Short name: CFC
- Founded: August 28, 2014; 12 years ago
- Ground: Marina Arena
- Capacity: 40,000 (36,000 seated)
- Owner(s): Abhishek Bachchan; MS Dhoni; Vita Dani
- Head coach: Clifford Miranda
- League: Indian Super League
- 2025–26: Indian Super League, 13th of 14
- Website: chennaiyinfc.com
Home colours	Away colours

Chennaiyin Football Club is an Indian professional football club based in Chennai, Tamil Nadu. The club competes in the Indian Super League (ISL), the top flight of Indian football. The club was founded in August 2014 during the inaugural season of the ISL. It has won the ISL title on two occasions, in the 2015, 2017–18 seasons respectively.

The club is owned by Vita Dani, Bollywood actor Abhishek Bachchan and Indian cricketer MS Dhoni. The team's name Chennaiyin FC means Chennai's football club in Tamil where the 'yin' suffix is similar to a possessive 's' in English. The club's primary colour is blue ever since its inception and its logo is the Dhrishti Bommai, a representation of chasing away negativity and preserving positivity in the Tamil culture.

Chennaiyin has played three ISL Finals winning it two times. The first final they played was the 2015 final which they beat FC Goa by 3–2 in Goa. In their second final, they played against Bengaluru FC at Bengaluru and won their second title by winning 3–2. During 2019–20 season Chennaiyin played their third final against ATK, which they lost 3–1.

== History ==
=== Origin ===
When the Indian Super League was founded in 2014, the city of Chennai was one of the nine proposed cities up for franchise bidding. However, on 11 April 2014 it was reported that Chennai's main bidder, a consortium led by Sunil Gavaskar would drop out due to commitments with the Board of Control for Cricket in India. In August 2014, with two months before the 2014 ISL season, the Bangalore owners Sun Group dropped out due to disputes with the organizers. Initially reports came out that the ISL organizers were looking for bidders for new owners for the Bangalore franchise before it was revealed that Ronnie Screwvala and actor Abhishek Bachchan would together bid for a Chennai team instead of a Bangalore franchise.

=== Foundation ===
On 14 August 2014, it was reported that ISL officials were inspecting the Jawaharlal Nehru Stadium in Chennai for the proposed team. Finally, the team was bid for by actor Abhishek Bachchan and Vita Dani. On 12 September 2014, Italian World Cup winner Marco Materazzi was hired as player-manager. On 6 October 2014, former Indian cricket captain Mahendra Singh Dhoni became the joint co-owner of the club. The club officially launched their jersey on 9 October 2014 but had changed their home jersey's pattern in the 2018–19 Indian Super League.

=== Marco Materazzi era (2014–2016) ===

Lineup against FC Goa in 2015 Indian Super League final

On 15 October 2014, Chennaiyin won their first Indian Super League fixture with a 2–1 victory over FC Goa. The goals were scored by Balwant Singh, who became the first Indian player to score in the competition, and the former Brazil international Elano. On 28 November 2014, the club brought Alessandro Nesta, who won the World Cup for Italy out of retirement. The team finished its 14-game regular season in first place in the league. In the semi-finals, the team lost the first leg 3–0 to Kerala Blasters FC. In the second leg, they overturned the deficit by leading 3–0 in regular time. However, a 117th-minute goal by Stephen Pearson sent Kerala through to the finals.

For the second season of Indian Super League, they retained six players: Balwant Singh, Jayesh Rane, Dhanachandra Singh, Jeje Lalpekhlua, Harmanjot Khabra and Abhishek Das. They also signed Godwin Franco and Mehrajuddin Wadoo. On the last day of the transfer window, Chennaiyin FC announced that they had signed back Stiven Mendoza. The season started with the team losing the first two games. Though the team managed to score points by winning at Goa and Mumbai, they lost another three games on the trot. By the third week of November, Chennaiyin were placed last in the league table. However, the team won four consecutive games to qualify for the playoffs, finishing at 3rd place in the regular season. They won the second season of the ISL by beating FC Goa 3–2 in the finals.

For the third season, of Indian Super League, they retained six players: Mehrajuddin Wadoo, Jayesh Rane, Dhanachandra Singh, Jeje Lalpekhlua, Harmanjot Khabra, Thoi Singh and Abhishek Das. Chennai signed John Arne Riise as the marquee player for the season. The season kicked off with a draw against Kolkata. Winning only three games through the season, the team finished in seventh place, just one point more than the last placed FC Goa. After a dismal season, it was announced on 6 March that Marco Materazzi and Chennaiyin parted ways on mutual consent.

=== John Gregory era (2017–2019) ===
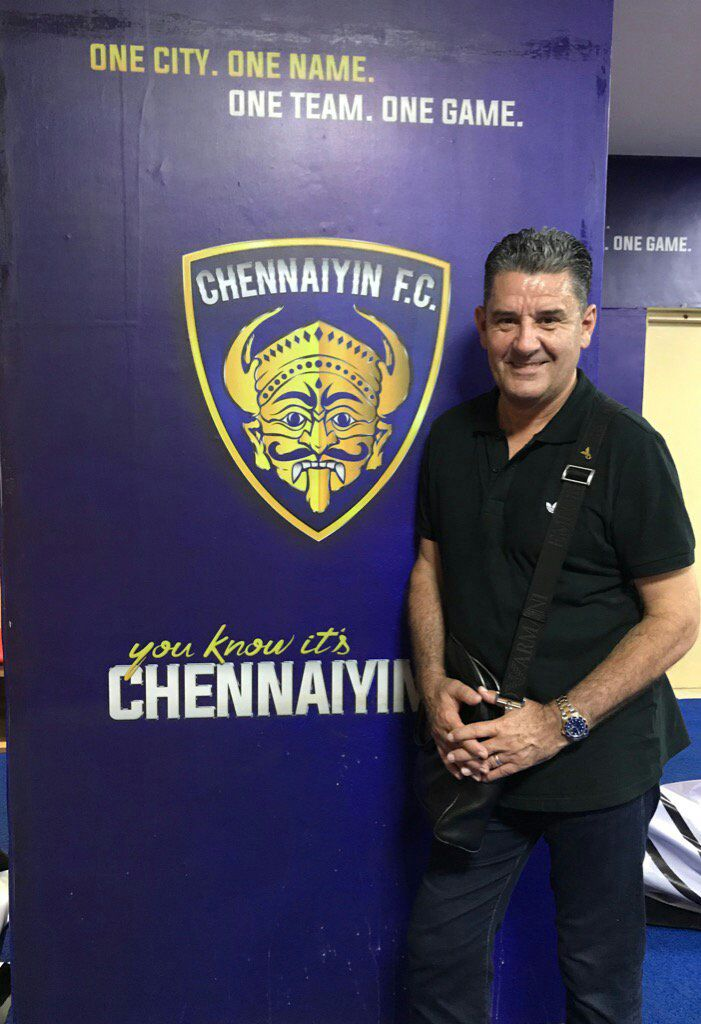
John Gregory led the team to ISL title in his first season

Lineup against Bengaluru FC in 2018 Indian Super League final

On 3 July 2017, the club announced the appointment of former Aston Villa Manager John Gregory as the head coach for the 2017–18 season. He took charge in September and the club traveled to Thailand for pre-season. Chennaiyin lost Gregory's first league game as head coach on 19 November against FC Goa. The team won its next three matches against Northeast United FC, FC Pune City and ATK. Mumbai City FC brought Chennaiyin FC's winning run to an end with a battling 1–0 win at home inside the Mumbai Football Arena. The blues then travelled to Sree Kanteerava Stadium, where they beat Bengaluru FC 2–1 in a tightly contested match. Chennaiyin FC were held to a 1–1 draw when they faced Kerala Blasters at home in their next game. In spite of the draw, The Blues went top of the table with 13 points after seven games. The team went on to win the finals against Bangalore on their home ground and became the champions for the second time. Chennaiyin FC finished as runner-ups in AIFF Super Cup 2019 where they lost to FC Goa 2–1. Following Indian Super League glory in 2017–18, Chennaiyin became the first Indian club, representing the ISL, to play in the AFC Cup, as they drew 0–0 with Colombo FC in Sri Lanka on 6 March 2019. A week later, they won the second leg 1–0 in Chennai to progress to the 2019 AFC Cup group stage. Chennayin FC is the first ISL club to reach in Group stage of AFC Cup 2019 i.e. in Group E. They played a tie of 0–0 to Minerva Punjab FC on 3 April 2019 and won 2–0 to Nepalese club Manang Marshyangdi Club on 17 April 2019 whereby Maílson Alves and Chris Herd were also accompanied by win against Abahani Limited Dhaka by 1–0 and goal scorer was Anirudh Thapa on 30 April 2019. On 19 June 2019 Chennaiyin FC faced a draw of 1–1 against Minerva Punjab F.C. where Mohammed Rafi secured a goal in the last minute of game. On John Gregory's 65th birthday the club announced that the coach's contract was renewed which will expire soon after the 2019–20 Indian Super League. After losing the AFC Cup the club then made some shocking decisions by releasing their captain, Mailson Alves and Raphael Augusto as a preparation for the 2019–20 Indian Super League. They also released some of the Indian players in their team which includes C.K. Vineeth, Mohammed Rafi, Halicharan Narzary, Isaac Vanmalsawma. They then signed Nerijus Valskis, Lucian Goian, Dragoș Firțulescu, André Schembri, Masih Saighani and Rafael Crivellaro to strengthen their squad. On 30 November 2019 John Gregory resigned from his post as head coach even though owner Mrs. Vita Dani tried in vain to get him to stay. Under his guidance Chennai won their second Indian Super League trophy.

=== Owen Coyle (2019–2020 & 2023-2025) ===

Lineup against ATK in 2020 Indian Super League final

Owen took the charge of the club on 4 December 2019. Under his guidance Chennaiyin faced 1–1 draw against Jamshedpur, won 3–1 against Kerala Blasters and lost a dramatic game 4–3 to Goa in the initial days of Coyle. They lost to Odisha on 6 January 2020 and won a game against Hyderabad by 3–1.

The Coyle era catapulted Chennaiyin FC to 4th from Bottom of the table (9th), thus earning them qualification for the playoffs. He went on to guide Chennaiyin FC to the 2020 ISL final after beating FC Goa 6–5 on aggregate over the two legs of the semifinals.

Chennaiyin were beaten 3–1 by ATK with the game played behind closed doors, due to the rise of the COVID-19 pandemic in India. Nerijus Valskis, who scored in the final for Chennaiyin, topped golden boot tally consequently, he was awarded ISL golden boot.

=== Csaba László (2020–2021) ===
Csaba László took the charge of the club on 30 August 2020. He had an average season with three wins and 11 draws. On April 10, 2021, he parted ways with the club.

=== Božidar Bandović (2021–2022) ===
Chennaiyin FC appointed Bozidar Bandovic as their manager for the 2021–22 season following the 0–5 defeat to FC Goa - the heaviest loss endured by the club in its history, the club said in a statement. "Bandovic was in charge of the first team for 16 matches - winning five, drawing four and losing seven. The team's assistant coach Syed Sabir Pasha will take over in the interim. Over the years, we've lost and won. But as a club, losing like this is something we cannot stand by and watch. And for now, we have full confidence in Sabir to see the season through," co-owner Vita Dani stated.

== Stadium ==
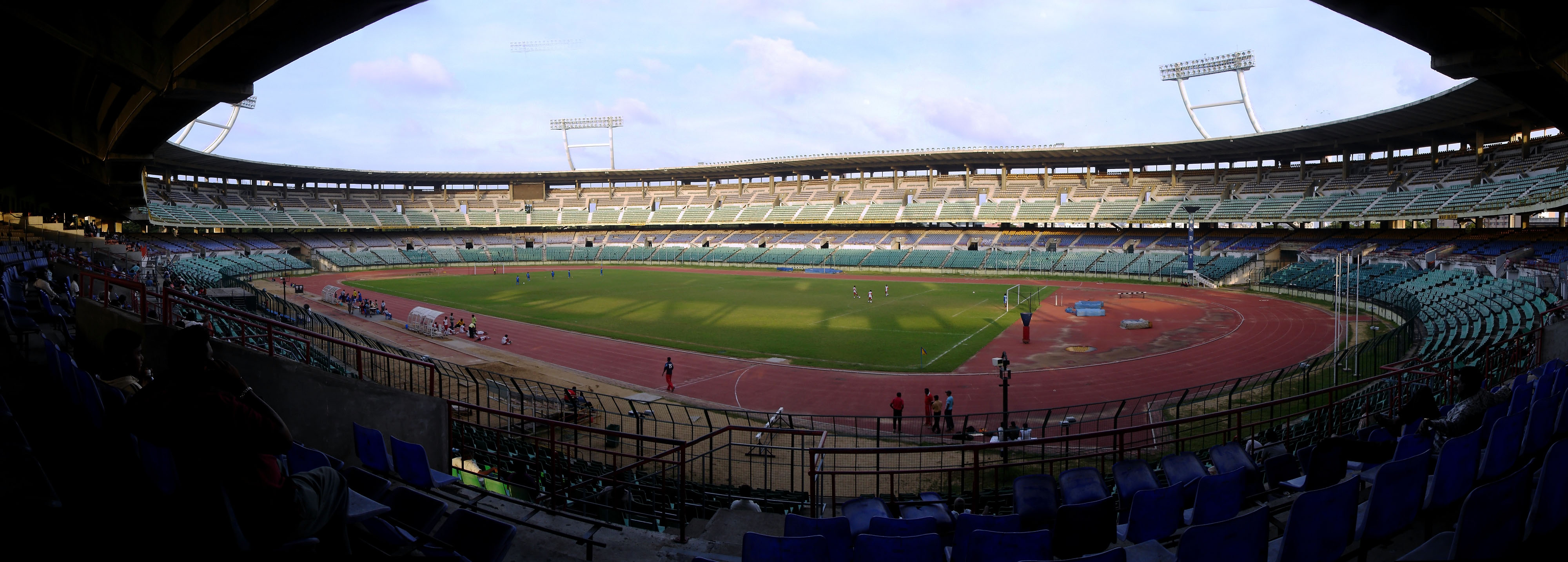
Panoramic view of Jawaharlal Nehru Stadium, Chennai

Chennaiyin FC play their home matches at the Jawaharlal Nehru Stadium in Chennai nicknamed the Marina Arena. The stadium is located at Sydenhams Road, Park Town behind the Chennai Central suburban Railway station and Ripon Building. The stadium is named after Jawaharlal Nehru, India's first Prime Minister and earlier hosted cricket Test Matches between 1956 and 1965.

== Support ==
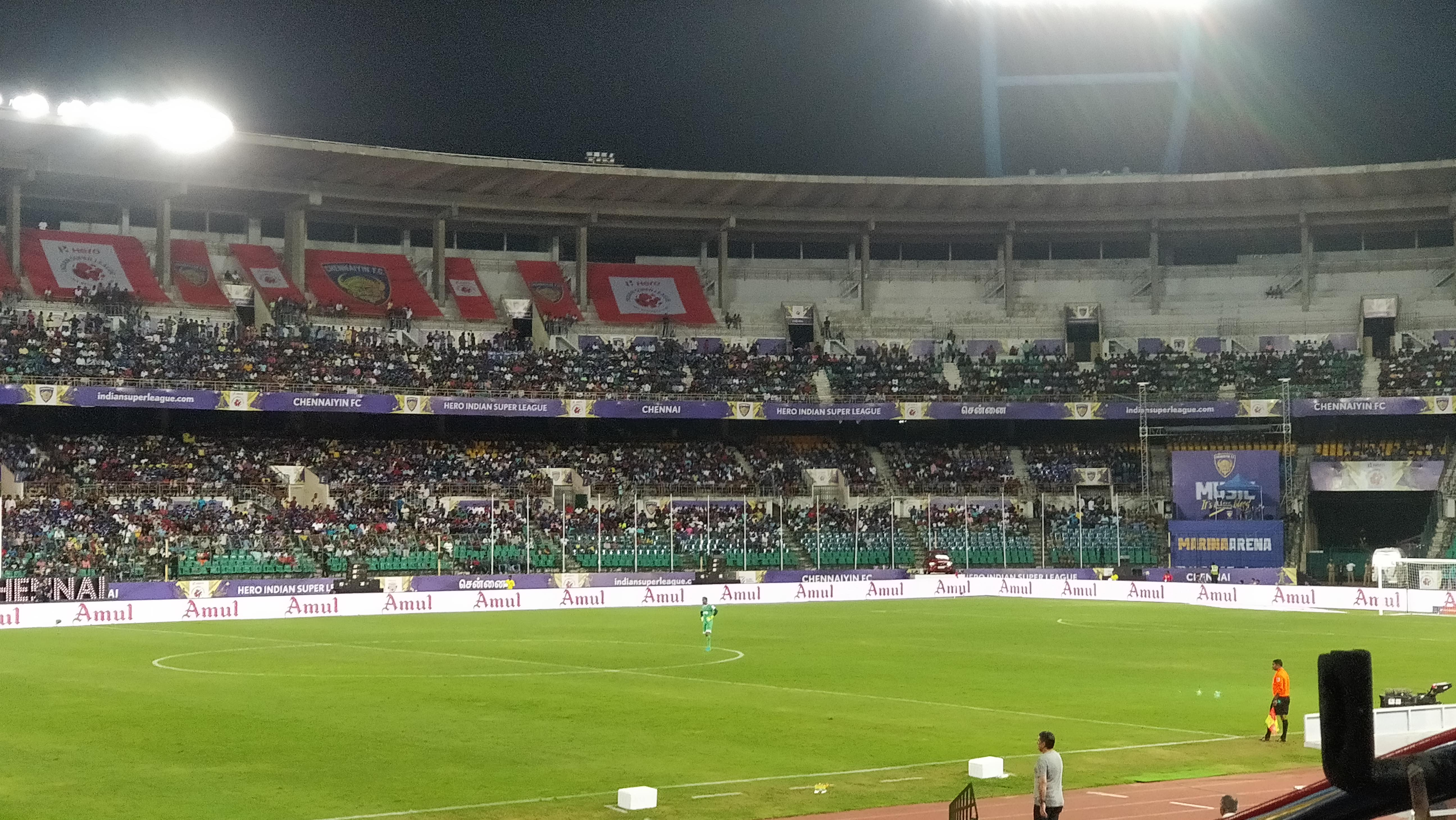
Jawaharlal Nehru Stadium, the club's home ground.

Chennaiyin has a considerable fan base with an average attendance of over 20,000 over the first three seasons.

Chennaiyin FC is one of the very few clubs in India to have multiple active fan groups. The B Stand Blues (BSB) and the Supermachans are the two fan groups of Chennaiyin FC. Both the fan groups are known among the Indian football scenario and they are active on and off the season. Their support to the team is very dedicated and they also carry out CSR activities.

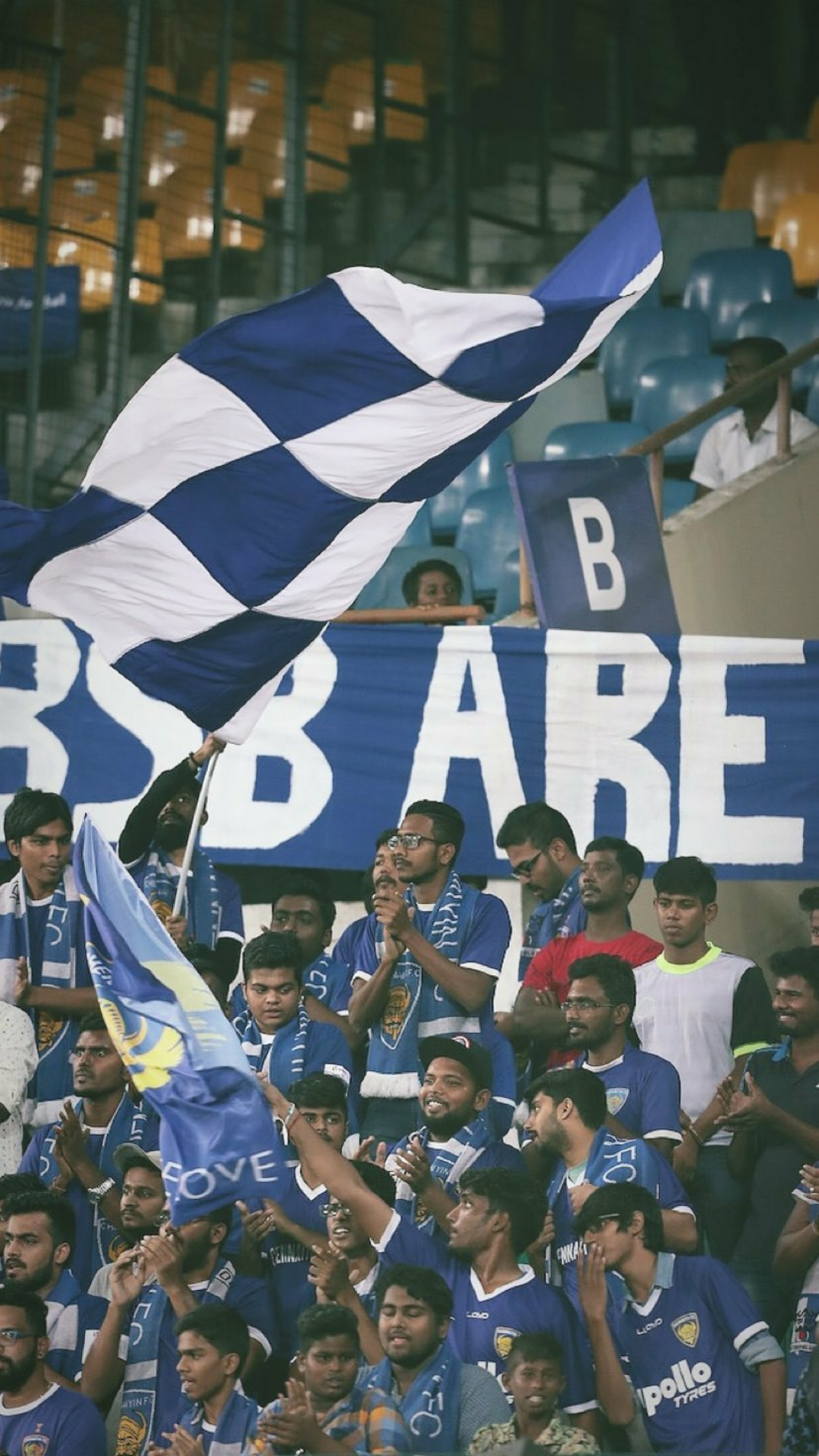
BSB cheering for Chennaiyin in 2017

Both these fan groups have worked so hard to spread the football fan culture in the state. They even travel to some away games to extend their support to the club. The most famous away trip is the 2017-18 ISL finals against Bengaluru FC, where there were hundreds of fans from both fan clubs despite the game happening in a different state. Both fan clubs ended up conquering the stands of Kanteerava when their club had conquered it on the field.

Opponents generally find the Chennaiyin crowd intimidating. Indian captain Sunil Chhetri himself has acknowledged this fact, as he's usually been on the receiving end when he travels to the Marina Arena in BFC colours. In addition to this, Chennaiyin also has a huge fan following all over the state of Tamil Nadu. Their social media following is among the top in Indian clubs.

== Rivalry ==
Since Chennaiyin FC, Bengaluru FC and Kerala Blasters FC are dominant clubs from South India, the rivalry between these clubs' fans are visible both on ground and on various social platforms. The matches between the clubs create sparks among the clubs and especially the fans. The meetings between the three teams are known as the South Indian Derby.

== Kit manufacturers and shirt sponsors ==
Period	Kit manufacturer	Shirt sponsor	Back sponsor
2014–15	TYKA	Ozone Group	Reliance Digital
2015–16	TYKA	Ozone Group	
2016–17	Puma	TVS Tyres	Himalaya Men
2017–18	Performax	Apollo Tyres	Jio
2018–19	Performax	Apollo Tyres	Gyproc
2019–21	Performax	Apollo Tyres	DafaNews
2021–22	Nivia	Apollo Tyres	DafaNews
2022–23	Nivia	Apollo Tyres	Parimatch News
2023–24	Nivia	MelBat	Polyhose
2024–25	SIX5SIX	MelBat	Ramraj Cotton
2025–26	SIX5SIX	ISGL	
2026–27	SIX5SIX		

== Players ==
=== First-team squad ===
As of 1 August 2026

Note: Flags indicate national team as defined under FIFA eligibility rules; some limited exceptions apply. Players may hold more than one non-FIFA nationality.

No.	Pos.	Nation	Player
1	GK	IND	Samik Mitra
2	DF	RWA	Emmanuel Imanishimwe
3	DF	IND	Laldinpuia
4	DF	POR	Nuno Reis
5	DF	IND	Muhammed Saheef
6	DF	IND	Ankit Mukherjee
7	FW	BRA	Ramon Tanque (on loan from Persib Bandung)
8	MF	SRB	Nikola Stojanovic
10	MF	FRA	Madih Talal
11	FW	IND	Bryce Miranda
13	GK	IND	Mohammad Nawaz (captain)
14	MF	IND	Ayush Chhetri
16	FW	IND	Shubham Rawat

No.	Pos.	Nation	Player
17	MF	IND	Lalhriatpuia Chawngthu
20	DF	IND	Pritam Kotal
21	MF	IND	Maheson Singh
23	DF	IND	Vignesh Dakshinamurthy
24	FW	IND	Irfan Yadwad
25	MF	IND	Glan Martins
27	DF	IND	Namgyal Bhutia
32	DF	IND	Dippendu Biswas
37	MF	IND	Jiteshwor Singh
42	MF	IND	Brison Fernandes
43	MF	IND	Nitishkumar Meitei Yengkhom
47	DF	IND	Klusner Pereira

=== Out on loan ===
Note: Flags indicate national team as defined under FIFA eligibility rules; some limited exceptions apply. Players may hold more than one non-FIFA nationality.

No.	Pos.	Nation	Player
—	DF	IND	Jahangir Ahmad (at Rajasthan United until 30 June 2027)

== Personnel ==
=== Technical staff ===
As of 12 November 2025

Role	Name
Head coach	(India) Clifford Miranda
Assistant coach	(India) Noel Wilson
Goalkeeping coach	(India) Rajath Guha
Head of performance analysis	(India) Aswin K

=== Management ===
Board of directors

Position	Name
Co-owners	(India) MS Dhoni (India) Abhishek Bachchan (India) Vita Dani

== Top goalscorers ==
Here is the list of top goalscorers(minimum 3 goals) across all competitions for Chennaiyin FC.

Rank	Player name	Matches	Goals
1	(India) Jeje Lalpekhlua	77	25
2	(Lithuania) Nerijus Valskis	31	17
3	(Colombia) Stiven Mendoza	25	17
4	(India) Rahim Ali	85	14
5	(Brazil) Rafael Crivellaro	54	14
6	(India) Anirudh Thapa	125	12
7	(India) Lallianzuala Chhangte	53	12
8	(Brazil) Elano Blumer	26	12
9	(Croatia) Petar Sliskovic	22	11
10	(Colombia) Wilmar Jordán Gil	24	10
11	(Netherlands) Nasser El Khayati	13	9
12	(Brazil) Maílson Alves	57	8
13	(Brazil) Raphael Augusto	69	7
14	(India) **Irfan Yadwad**	48	7
15	(Australia) Jordan Murray	28	7
16	(Brazil) Bruno Pelissari	25	7
17	(India) Vincy Barretto	57	6
18	(Scotland) Connor Shields	49	6
19	(Nigeria) **Chima Chukwu**	24	6
20	(Ghana) Kwame Karikari	23	6
21	(France) Bernard Mendy	39	5
22	(India) Mohammed Rafi	21	5
23	(Malta) André Schembri	18	5
24	(Nigeria) Dudu Omagbemi	13	5
25	(India) Thoi Singh	84	4
26	(India) **Farukh Choudhary**	45	4
27	(Spain) Iñigo Calderón	32	4
28	(Brazil) Lukas Brambilla	23	4
29	(India) CK Vineeth	18	4
30	(Guinea-Bissau) Esmaël Gonçalves	16	4
31	(Brazil) Eli Sabia	79	3
32	(India) Edwin Sydney	79	3
33	(India) Ninthoi Meetei	55	3
34	(England) Ryan Edwards	46	3
35	(Netherlands) Gregory Nelson	38	3
36	(India) Dhanachandra Singh	30	3
37	(Germany) Julius Duker	28	3
38	(Iran) Vafa Hakhamaneshi	24	3
39	(Hungary) Vladimir Koman	17	3
40	(Italy) Davide Succi	13	3

In Bold: Players currently playing for Chennaiyin FC

== Honours ==
=== League ===
- Indian Super League (as top-tier league) (Note: For first three seasons, ISL was considered as just a tournament, but not as league. Before fourth season, AFC recognised ISL as an official top tier league along with I-League and from 9th season it's considered as only top tier league.)
  - Champions (1): 2017–18
  - Runners-up (1): 2019–20

=== Cup ===
- Super Cup
  - Runners-up (1): 2019

=== Other Domestic tournaments ===
- Indian Super League (as tournament)
  - Champions (1): 2015

== AFC club ranking ==
As of 9 August 2026

Rank	Club	Points
244	(Qatar) Al-Sailiya SC	1,261
245	(India) Real Kashmir FC	1,261
246	(India) Chennaiyin	1,261
247	(Thailand) Samut Prakan	1,259
248	(Saudi Arabia) Najran SC	1,259

== Continental record ==
Season	Competition	Round	Club	Home	Away	Aggregate
2019	AFC Cup	Play-off round	(Sri Lanka) Colombo	1–0	0–0	1–0
2019	AFC Cup	Group E	(India) Minerva Punjab	0–0	1–1	Group stage: 2nd Knockout Stage: DNQ
2019	AFC Cup	Group E	(Nepal) Manang Marshyangdi Club	2–0	2–3	Group stage: 2nd Knockout Stage: DNQ
2019	AFC Cup	Group E	(Bangladesh) Abahani Limited Dhaka	1–0	3–2	Group stage: 2nd Knockout Stage: DNQ

== eSports ==
The organizers of ISL introduced eISL, a FIFA video game tournament, for the ISL playing clubs, each represented by two players. Chennaiyin FC hosted a series of qualifying games for all the participants wanting to represent the club in eISL. On 20 November the club announced the signing of the two players. They won the inaugural eISL on 20 March 2022, following 2022 Indian Super League final.

=== Roster ===
Channaiyin FC eSports FIFA roster
Players
Coaches

Handle	Name	Nationality
saranshjain7	Jain, Saransh	India
Navinh29	H, Navin	India

Head coach

- Vacant

Legend:
- (I) Inactive
- (S) Suspended
- Substitute
- (injured) Injury / Illness

Latest roster transaction: 19 November 2021.

== See also ==
- List of football clubs in India
- Sport in Chennai
- Chennaiyin FC Reserves and Academy
