= Chennai City FC =

Former Indian association football club

Chennai City
- Full name: Chennai City Football Club
- Nickname: The Lions
- Short name: CCFC
- Founded: 1946; 80 years ago (as Nethaji Sports Club); 2014; 12 years ago (as Chennai City FC)
- Dissolved: 2023; 3 years ago
- Ground: JL Nehru Stadium, Chennai; JL Nehru Stadium, Coimbatore
- Capacity: 30,000
- Owner: Rohit Ramesh
- Head coach: Vacant
Home colours	Away colours

Chennai City Football Club was an Indian professional football club based in Chennai, Tamil Nadu. The club predominantly competed in the I-League, which was then highest division of Indian football league system. They have also appeared in the Chennai Football League. Established in 1946 as Nethaji Sports Club, Chennai City spent its grand majority of history by competing in state leagues and knock-out tournaments until entering the national stage in 2016.

Chennai City FC was known by its nickname "The Lions". On 11 December 2016, the club was awarded a direct-entry spot into the I-League for 2016–17 season, and became champion in the 2018–19 season.

== History ==
=== Formation and early years (1946–2016) ===
Chennai City FC was founded in 1946, as "Nethaji Sports Club" during the British rule in India. The club was named after "Netaji" Subhas Chandra Bose. It was incorporated by S. V. Kanagasabai, E. Vadivelu, T. R. Govindarajan, P. V. Chellappa, and K. Ekambaram. Nethaji Sports Club was primarily affiliated with Tamil Nadu Football Association (TNFA), has appeared in several state competitions including Vittal Trophy, TFA Shield and Chennai District Football League. With the support from TNFA, Nethaji simultaneously organized a Champions Trophy named 'Universal Cup' after the end of regular league season. The club since its inception, used to have a young squad with players usually aged 21–22 and the club did come close to national relevance a couple of times, making appearances in the Durand Cup and Federation Cup.

Since the 1990s, Nethaji Sports Club participated in Madras Football League, conducted by the Chennai Football Association (CFA). In state tournament, Tamil Nadu State League, they finished as runners-up thrice in 2004, 2005–06 and 2007. Nethaji clinched their first CFA Premier/Senior Division League title in 2009, led by then coach D. Sekaran, in which club's Ivorian striker Dombia Mamadou became top scorer. The club was renamed to "Chennai City FC" on 11 June 2014.

=== I-League years (2016–2021) ===
On 11 December 2016, Chennai City was accepted as a direct entry club for the 2016–17 I-League season after the withdrawal of Dempo. Thus it became the second club from Tamil Nadu to play in the top division after Indian Bank Recreational Club team in National Football League. Chennai City made it to the Federation Cup by finishing eighth in the I-League table and did it with a game remaining in the league.

Chennai City did decent in their first season at the highest level of the domestic league. Their potential was highlighted when they managed to hold off Mohun Bagan for a very long time and even got wins against Aizawl and East Bengal. In the 2016–17 Indian Federation Cup, they were pitted in Group A against Aizawl, East Bengal, and Churchill Brothers. Chennai City lost their first games and was out of contention before playing the last fixture. The team did salvage pride as they won the game against Churchill Brothers emphatically in a 3–1 victory.

On 6 February 2019, Chennai City FC officially announced that the club agreed a partnership deal with Swiss Super League giants FC Basel. The club owned 26 percent of Chennai City and would develop football in the state by building football schools for young talents. FC Basel would also have a player exchange program, including first team players, with CCFC and help the club with technical know how.

"Our long-term philosophy is to cultivate our style of football — the Chennai City FC style — throughout the ranks. We want our junior teams to play the same way as the senior team is now playing. That would improve the ecosystem immensely. We want to build the Chennai City model of football in Tamil Nadu."

— Rohit Ramesh, owner and CEO of Chennai City FC, on club's long-term philosophy (after their historic I-League triumph).

On 9 March 2019, Chennai City FC beat former champions Minerva Punjab 3–1 to be crowned the 2018–19 I-League champions. This marked the finish of a very successful season for the club, defying all expectations to win the league. Spanish-Uruguayan forward Pedro Manzi Cruz also scored a brace in this match, and was the joint top scorer of the league, scoring 21 league goals with record four hat-tricks. This was Chennai City FC's maiden I-League title, and later they represented India at the 2020 AFC Champions League playoffs and 2020 AFC Cup respectively. They played a single game in Group E of the AFC Cup at their home ground before the competition being abandoned due to the COVID-19 pandemic, in which Chennai City drew 2–2 with Maldivian club Maziya S&RC on 11 March 2020. The club then participated in 2019 Durand Cup with all-Indian squad. They later went on to participate in 2019 edition of Sheikh Kamal International Club Cup in Bangladesh, but failed to advance to the knock-out stages.

Chennai City also participated in the Hero Super Cup during March–April 2019, and lost in the semi-finals to eventual champions FC Goa. However, they did manage to win 2–1 against ISL champions Bengaluru FC in the quarter-finals. In December 2020, Satyasagara appointed as head coach, and the club ended their 2020–21 I-League campaign in ninth place.

=== Expulsion and changes in sporting licence ===
In December 2021, the AIFF club licensing committee unanimously decided not to grant the exemption sought by the club after having failed to receive the ICLS license. As a result, Chennai City was barred from participating in the 2021–22 I-League and was replaced by debutant Kenkre. The club also failed to take part in 2021–22 Chennai Senior Division league.

On 3 March 2023, the club owner Rohit Ramesh officially announced that the sporting license of Chennai City FC has been transferred. The owners are "out of footballing activities," while retaining the name, rights and logo of the club. Upon transfer of the license to the new licensee, the club announced that they will restart footballing activities from the lower divisions of the state league. Since 2016 until 2023, the club was owned by SkaSports Investments Private Limited, the holding company later in August 2023 – bought majority stakes in Cambodian Premier League side Angkor Tiger.

== Kit manufacturers and shirt sponsors ==
Period	Kit manufacturer	Shirt sponsor
2016—2017	Classic Polo	Baako
2017—2018	Counter Sports	—
2018—2019	Penalty	Uhlsport
2019—2021	Nivia	TVS Group

== Stadium ==
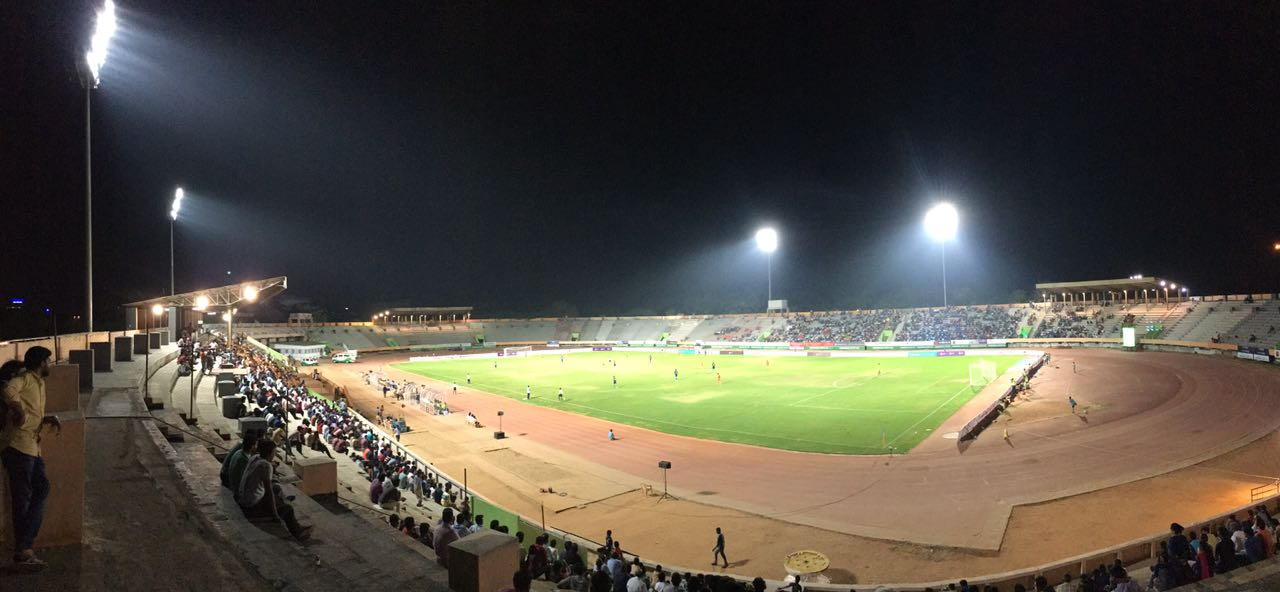
Jawaharlal Nehru Stadium in Coimbatore on a matchday of the I-League in 2018

The club played its home matches at the Jawaharlal Nehru Stadium in Chennai and also played most of its home games for the I-League seasons at Jawaharlal Nehru Stadium in Coimbatore. Constructed in 1971, it is currently used mostly for football matches and has a capacity of 30,000.

In 2019, the club decided to play their continental matches (AFC Champions League playoffs and AFC Cup) at the EKA Arena in Ahmedabad.

== Affiliated clubs ==
The following clubs were affiliated with Chennai City FC:

- (Finland) JS Hercules (2017–2019)
- (Switzerland) FC Basel (2019–2020)

== Honours ==
=== League ===
- I-League
  - Champions (1): 2018–19
- CFA Premier Division League
  - Champions (2): 2008–09, 2016–17
  - Third place (1): 2015–16
- Tamil Nadu State League
  - Runners-up (3): 2004, 2005–06, 2007
- CFA Second Division League
  - Champions (1): 2013–14

=== Cup ===
- Moulana Abul Kalam Azad Trophy
  - Runners-up (1): 2008

== Notable players ==
For all former notable Chennai City FC players with a Wikipedia article, see: Chennai City FC players.

=== Past internationals ===
- The foreign players below, had senior/youth international cap(s) for their respective countries. Players whose name is listed represented their countries before or after playing for Chennai City FC.
- (Nigeria) Echezona Anyichie (2016–2017)
- (Afghanistan) Zohib Islam Amiri (2017)
- (Kyrgyzstan) Ildar Amirov (2017–2018)
- (Timor-Leste) Murilo de Almeida (2017–2018)
- (Kyrgyzstan) Veniamin Shumeyko (2017–2018)
- (Slovenia) Uroš Poljanec (2017–2018)
- (South Sudan) Duach Jock (2018)
- (Kyrgyzstan) Aman Talantbekov (2018)
- (Australia) Jerrad Tyson (2018)
- (Lebanon) Feiz Shamsin (2018–2019)
- (Tibet) Tenzin Samdup (2018–2019)
- (Singapore) Iqbal Hussain (2020–2021)

== Continental record ==
Season	Competition	Round	Club	Home	Away	Aggregate	Scorers
2020	AFC Champions League	Preliminary round 1	(Bahrain) Al-Riffa	0–1			(Spain) Adolfo "Fito" Miranda (2 goals)
2020	AFC Cup	Group E	(Maldives) Maziya S&RC	2–2	–	Season abandoned due to the COVID-19 pandemic	(Spain) Adolfo "Fito" Miranda (2 goals)
2020	AFC Cup	Group E	(Maldives) TC Sports	–	–	Season abandoned due to the COVID-19 pandemic	(Spain) Adolfo "Fito" Miranda (2 goals)
2020	AFC Cup	Group E	(Bangladesh) Bashundhara Kings	–	–	Season abandoned due to the COVID-19 pandemic	(Spain) Adolfo "Fito" Miranda (2 goals)

== Records and statistics ==
=== League history ===
Season	Div.	Tms.	Pos.	Attendance	Federation Cup/Super Cup	Durand Cup	AFC Champions League	AFC Cup
2016–17	I-League	10	8	2,949	Group stage	DNP	DNQ	DNQ
2017–18	I-League	10	8	8,194	Qualification round	DNP	DNQ	DNQ
2018–19	I-League	11	1	6,138	Semi-finals	Group stage	DNQ	DNQ
2019–20	I-League	11	7	7,825	DNP	Group Stage	Preliminary round 1	Group Stage
2020–21	I-League	11	9	Played in closed stadiums due to COVID-19 pandemic in India	Tournament Suspended due to COVID-19	DNP	DNQ	DNQ
2021–22	I-League	13	Barred by AIFF	Played in closed stadiums due to COVID-19 pandemic in India	TBD	DNP	DNQ	DNQ

Key

- Tms. = Number of teams
- Pos. = Position in league
- Attendance/G = Average league attendance
- DNP = Did not participate
- DNQ = Did not qualify

=== Overall ===
As of 14 January 2017

Season	I-League								Asia						Top Scorer	
Season	P	W	D	L	GF	GA	Pts	Position	P	W	D	L	GF	GA	Player	Goals
2016–17	18	4	5	9	15	29	17	8	–	–	–	–	–	–	(Brazil) Charles	4
2017–18	18	4	7	7	15	24	19	8	–	–	–	–	–	–	(France) Joachim	5
2018–19	18	13	4	3	48	28	43	1	–	–	–	–	–	–	(Spain) Manzi	21
2019–20	15	5	5	5	20	21	20	7	2	0	1	1	2	3	(Japan) Yusa	5

== Head coaches ==
Name	Nationality	From	To	P	W	D	L	GF	GA	Win%	Ref.
Robin Charles Raja	India	13 December 2016	8 February 2017	7	1	1	5	3	11	14.29	
V. Soundararajan	India	9 January 2017	14 March 2018	13	3	4	6	15	19	23.08	
Akbar Nawas	Singapore	15 March 2018	26 October 2020	38	20	9	9	68	49	52.63	
Satyasagara	Singapore	10 December 2020	2021	14	5	0	9	16	25	35.71	

== Team records ==
- Biggest margin win in I-League: 6–1 vs. Shillong Lajong in Coimbatore (29 December 2018).
- Cub's highest goal scorer in a single season of I-League: 21 goals, by (Uruguay) (Spain) Pedro Javier Manzi Cruz (2018–19 I-League).
- Highest transfer fee received: €125,000 plus sell-on clause from Japanese J2 League side Albirex Niigata — (Uruguay) (Spain) Pedro Javier Manzi Cruz (2020).

== Derivation ==
Named after Nethaji Sports Club, an outfit named "Nethaji FC" was incorporated in Chennai which currently competes in the CFA Premier Division League (the highest division of the Chennai Football League system).

== See also ==
- List of football clubs in India
- Sport in Chennai

== Footnotes ==
1. Formerly known as the Madras Football Association League.
2. Represented Tibet national football team in CONIFA tournaments internationally.
3. Formerly known as K. Balagumaran.
4. Pedro Javier Manzi Cruz has duel citizenship of both Uruguay and Spain.
