= Indian Bank Recreational Club =

Indian association football club

Indian Bank RC
- Full name: Indian Bank Recreational Club
- Nickname: The Bankers
- Founded: 1990; 36 years ago
- Ground: Jawaharlal Nehru Stadium, Chennai
- Capacity: 40,000
- Chief Coach: Syed Sabir Pasha
- League: CFA Senior Division

Indian Bank Recreational Club (also known as Football Club Indian Bank) is an Indian professional football club based in Chennai, Tamil Nadu. The club formerly participated in the National Football League, and the I-League Second Division. They are currently competing in Chennai Football League, under license from Tamil Nadu Football Association (TNFA).

Indian Bank was managed by former India international, Syed Sabir Pasha, who also captained the team since their inception. Indian Bank also participated in the National Football League II, and National Football League III.

== History ==
=== Formation and early years ===
Founded in 1907 as an Indian state-owned financial services company, Indian Bank established as a premier bank in the state of Tamil Nadu, and considering the popularity and passion for the game of football in the region, decided to launch a team of its own and register it with Tamil Nadu Football Association (TNFA). Thus the club was founded as "Indian Bank Sports and Recreational Club" in 1990 (they are also known as "FC Indian Bank").

In 1996, Indian Bank participated in the Scissors Cup, held in Kerala and reached the final. They finished as runners-up as Dempo clinched title defeating them 1–0.

Since then, Indian Bank began participating in tournaments conducted by TNFA and CFA, including Vittal Trophy, Chennai Universal Cup, and TFA Shield.

=== NFL journey ===
The club began their journey in the National Football League (India) in 1996, which was the inaugural season. Jayantilal Jain, the president of Indian Bank Recreational Club, made a compact team for 1996–97 NFL season. The team registered a 4–1 win against Mahindra United FC, which becomes the biggest away win in that season. The club later relegated from the NFL in 1999 after finishing at the bottom of the Group-B.

The club also competed in the I-League Second Division for a long time and in 2001–02, they declared as the joint-champions. From 2002 to 2006, V. P. Sathyan managed the club. In the 2003–04 NFL season, Indian Bank again relegated.

=== Later years ===
==== Winning trophies ====
In 1998, Indian Bank clinched their first knock-out title, Lal Bahadur Shastri Cup, defeating Delhi Blues XI 2–1.

In February 2000, they again emerged victorious in Tirur All-India Football Tournament in Kerala, beating Goan side Vasco SC 5–4.

In January 2008, Indian Bank beat football team of Reserve Bank of India 1–0 to win the Fr.Gerard Rolling Football Trophy, held at DBYC grounds, Basin Bridge, Chennai.

==== TNFA and CFA titles ====
Indian Bank began participating in regional league tournaments in Tamil Nadu since its inception. In the Chennai Super League, they clinched title twice in 1997 and 1998. In 2005 season, they achieved third place. In Tamil Nadu State League knock-out tournaments, Indian Bank won titles thrice in 2004, 2005–06 and 2007 season. In 2005, the club took part in Nice All-India Invitational Football Tournament in Thiruvananthapuram.

In 2016, Chennai City FC became the second club from Tamil Nadu to play in the top division I-League after Indian Bank Recreational Club's entry in the National Football League. In 2018, the club emerged champions of the CFA Senior Division league.

After a long hiatus between TNFA and CFA, the 2021–22 Chennai Senior Division kicked off on 9 May 2022 with 10 teams competing for the title, and Indian Bank achieved fifth place.

== Rivalries ==
In CFA Senior Division, the club has a rivalry with Chennai City FC (formerly Nethaji SC). The club has also a rivalry with local sides like Integral Coach Factory (ICF FC), Chennai Customs SC and Hindustan Eagles.

== Stadium ==
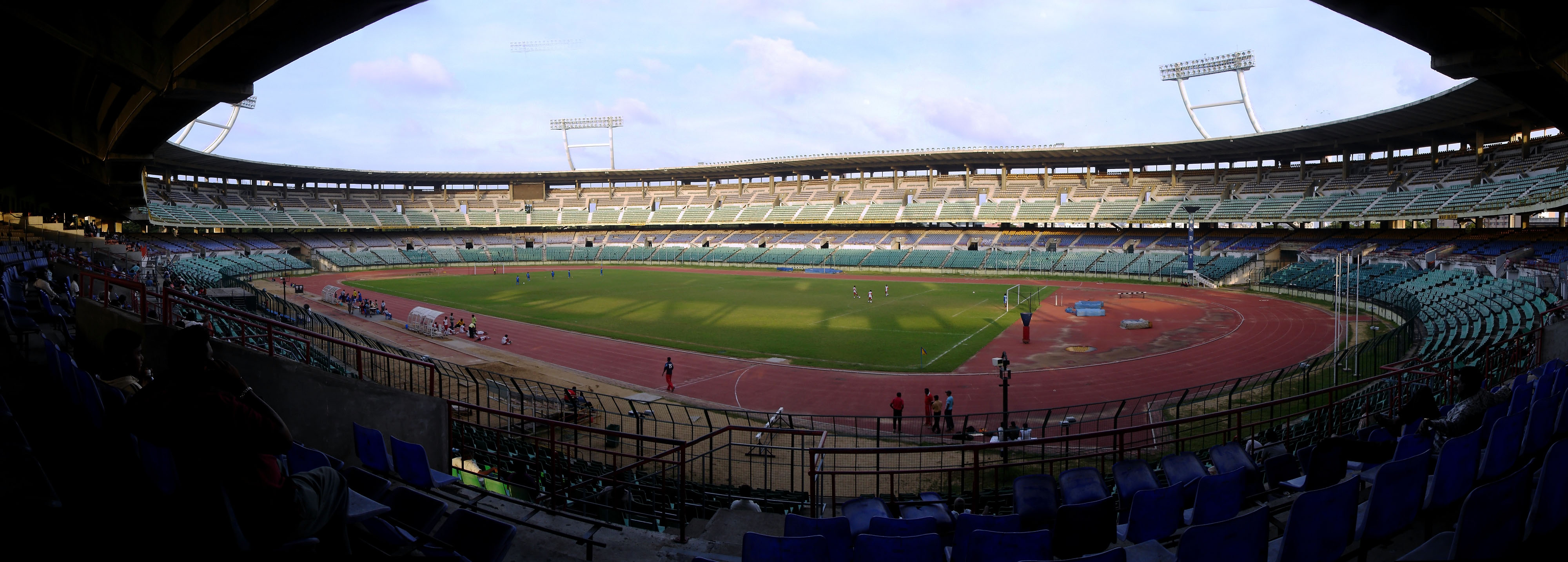
The Marina Arena, former home ground of Indian Bank Recreational Club

Indian Bank used Jawaharlal Nehru Stadium (also known as Marina Arena) in Chennai as their home ground since 1996, which has a capacity of 40,000 spectators. They also played some state-league matches at the Nehru Stadium of Coimbatore.

== Notable players ==
=== Past foreign internationals ===
- The players below had senior international cap(s) for their respective countries. Players whose name is listed, represented their countries before or after playing for Indian Bank RC.
- (Sri Lanka) Hammed Mohammed Nazir (1998–1999)
- (Sri Lanka) TN Bagoos (1999–2001)
- (Sri Lanka) Kasun Jayasuriya (2001–2002)
- (Sri Lanka) Kamaldeen Fuard (2000–2001)
- (Sri Lanka) Anton Silva (1998–1999)
- (Nigeria) Stanley Festus (2000–2002)
- (Sri Lanka) A.S. Mahendran (2001–2002)
- (Sri Lanka) Imran Mohamed (2002–2003)
- (Sri Lanka) Abdul Azeez Fazlur Rehman (2003–2004)
- (Sri Lanka) Mohammed Rawme (2003–2004)
- (Republic of the Congo) Kapongo Ilunga Patient (2018–2019)

=== Noted Indian international ===
- (India) V. P. Sathyan (1992–1993) – awarded the "AIFF Player of the Year" in 1993 representing Indian Bank RC in domestic league.

== Honours ==
=== Domestic league ===
- I-League Second Division
  - Champions (1): 2001–02
- National Football League II
  - Runners-up (1): 2001–02
- National Football League III (South Zone)
  - Champions (1): 2006–07
- Chennai Football League
  - Champions (6): 1997, 1998, 2000–01, 2002–03, 2007–08, 2017–18
  - Runners-up (2): 2004, 2022–23
  - Third place (1): 2005
- Tamil Nadu State League
  - Champions (3): 2004, 2005–06, 2007–08
  - Runners-up (1): 2006–07

=== Cup ===
- Fr.Gerard Rolling Football Trophy
  - Winners (1): 2008
- Vittal Trophy
  - Winners (1): 1990
- Lal Bahadur Shastri Cup
  - Winners (1): 1998
- Tirur All-India Football Tournament
  - Champions (1): 2000
- Sikkim Governor's Gold Cup
  - Runners-up (1): 1990
- Scissors Cup
  - Runners-up (1): 1996

== Other departments ==
=== Men's cricket ===
Indian Bank RC has men's cricket team, which is affiliated with Tamil Nadu Cricket Association (TNFA) and competes in TNFA Second Division League.

Honours

- Nachimuthu Trophy
  - Champions (1): 2019
- Chief Minister's T-20 Cup
  - Champions (1): 2022

=== Men's basketball ===
The club also operates men's basketball section, participate in numerous regional and domestic tournaments including PSG Trophy and IOB-CDBA Championship.

Honours

- All India Basketball Championship
  - Champions (1): 2019
- Tamil Nadu State Basketball Championship
  - Champions (1): 2019
- PSG Trophy
  - Champions (1): 2019

== See also ==
- List of football clubs in Chennai
- Sport in Chennai
- Financial services football clubs in India
- Defunct football clubs in India

== Footnotes ==
1. Formerly known as the Madras Football Association League.
