= Syed Sabir Pasha =

Indian footballer and coach

Personal information
- Full name: Syed Sabir Pasha
- Date of birth: 5 November 1972 (age 53)
- Place of birth: Madras, Tamil Nadu, India
- Position: Forward

Team information
- Current team: AIFF (technical director)

Senior career*
Years	Team	Apps	(Gls)
1991–2007	Indian Bank		
1999–2000	Dhaka Abahani		

International career
1993–2000	India	22	(7)

Managerial career
- 2007–2014: Indian Bank
- 2012–2014: Tamil Nadu
- 2014–2016: AIFF Elite Academy
- 2016–: Chennaiyin (assistant)
- 2017: Chennaiyin (caretaker)
- 2022–2023: Chennaiyin (interim coach)
- 2023–: AIFF (technical director)
Medal record
Men's football
Representing India
South Asian Games
Gold medal – first place	1995 Madras	Team competition
Bronze medal – third place	1999 Kathmandu	Team competition
- * Club domestic league appearances and goals

Syed Sabir Pasha (born 5 November 1972) is a former Indian football player and current technical director at the All India Football Federation. During his playing days, Pasha played for Indian Bank in the National Football League from 1991 to 2007 and represented India between 1993 and 2000.

== Playing career ==
Born in Tamil Nadu, Pasha started his career with Indian Bank in 1991. With Indian Bank, he won several titles including 2001–02 I-League Second Division, Chennai Super League, Tamil Nadu State League. He also won Lal Bahadur Shastri Cup in 1998 and finished runners-up in 1996 Scissors Cup.

Pasha played for Bangladeshi club Abahani Limited Dhaka in the Dhaka Premier League from 1999 to 2000.

Pasha later represented Tamil Nadu in competitions such as the Santosh Trophy where he was top scorer in the entire competition during the 1996 and 1999 seasons. Pasha never played football at a semi-professional level in the hotbeds of Indian football of Kolkata and Goa at the time. East Bengal, at one time, did attempt to sign Pasha but Pasha rejected in order to stay with Indian Bank.

On 23 January 2007, it was announced that Pasha had retired from playing football.

== International career ==
Pasha first began representing India at the international level in 1993. His most notable moment when playing for the national team was in 1995 when he scored the winning goal against Bangladesh in the 1995 South Asian Games final to win India the gold medal.

It was always wondered if Pasha representing a team in Tamil Nadu was going against him or not in terms of his standing with the national team. Despite his good performances with the national team whenever he played, Pasha only played a full-game with the national team on a couple of occasions.

=== International goals ===
Scores and results list India's goal tally first.

Goal	Date	Venue	Opponent	Score	Result	Competition	Source
1.	14 January 1994	Khalifa International Stadium, Doha, Qatar	Bangladesh	1–0	4–2	1994 Qatar Independence Cup	
2.	14 January 1994	Khalifa International Stadium, Doha, Qatar	Bangladesh	4–0	4–2	1994 Qatar Independence Cup	
3.	27 December 1995	Jawaharlal Nehru Stadium, Chennai, India	Bangladesh	1–0	1–0	1995 South Asian Games	
4.	26 April 1999	Fatorda Stadium, Goa, India	Pakistan	2–0	2–0	1999 SAFF Gold Cup	
5.	26 September 1999	Dasharath Rangasala, Kathmandu, Nepal	Pakistan	2–0	5–2	1999 South Asian Games	
6.	4 October 1999	Dasharath Rangasala, Kathmandu, Nepal	Maldives	2–1	3–1	1999 South Asian Games	
7.	26 November 1999	Tahnoun bin Mohammed Stadium, Dubai, Abu Dhabi	Sri Lanka	3–1	3–1	2000 AFC Asian Cup Qualifier	

== Coaching career ==
=== Indian Bank and Tamil Nadu ===
After retiring from playing football, Pasha went on to become the coach of Indian Bank. In 2010, Pasha received his AFC "A" License after completing the course in Japan. In 2012, he was appointed as the head coach of the Tamil Nadu football team for the Santosh Trophy. In his very first season as head coach, Pasha bought Tamil Nadu to the final of the 2012 Santosh Trophy but could not help his side win as they fell to Services 2–3.

=== AIFF Elite Academy ===
Before the 2014–15 I-League U19 season, Pasha was confirmed as the head coach of the AIFF Elite Academy.

=== Chennaiyin ===
On 17 February 2016, it was announced that Pasha had signed with Chennaiyin FC as their assistant coach and head of grassroots development.

== Honours ==
India

- SAFF Championship: 1999; runner-up: 1995
- South Asian Games Gold medal: 1995; Bronze medal: 1999

== See also ==
- List of Indian expatriate footballers
