= 2021–22 CFA Senior Division =

24th season of Chennai Super Division

CFA Senior Division
- Season: 2021–22
- Dates: 9 May – 4 June 2022
- Champions: Viva Chennai (1st title)
- Biggest win: AGORC 6–1 Hindustan Eagles
- Highest scoring: AGORC 6–1 Hindustan Eagles
- Total attendance: N/A
- All statistics correct as of 11 May 2022.

The 2021–22 CFA Senior Division, also known as 2021–22 Chennai Football League Senior Division, was the 24th season of the CFA Senior Division, the top-tier league in the Indian state Tamil Nadu. It is organised by Chennai Football Association (TNFA).

After a long habitus between TNFA and CFA, the 2022 season kicked off on 9 May 2022 with 10 teams competing for the title.

== Regular season ==
As of Matchday 22

Pos	Team	Pld	W	D	L	GF	GA	GD	Pts	Qualification or relegation
1	Viva Chennai	9	6	2	1	15	8	+7	20	Champions and Possible qualification to 2022–23 I-League 2
2	Chennai Customs	9	5	3	1	15	6	+9	18	
3	Swaraj	9	5	3	1	18	9	+9	18	
4	AGORC	9	5	1	3	26	12	+14	16	
5	Indian Bank	9	3	5	1	12	10	+2	14	
6	Hindustan Eagles	9	3	3	3	14	19	−5	12	
7	Arrows*	9	2	2	5	9	17	−8	8	
8	ITRC	9	2	2	5	8	20	−12	8	
9	Southern Railways	9	2	0	7	8	17	−9	6	
10	RBI	9	1	1	7	9	16	−7	4	Relegation to CFA First Division

Source: The Away End
Rules for classification: 1) points; 2) goal difference; 3) number of goals scored

: *Note : not to be confused with Indian Arrows

== See also ==
- 2021–22 season in state football leagues of India
- 2021–22 Bangalore Super Division
- 2021–22 Kerala Premier League
