= 2019 Asian Men's Club Volleyball Championship =

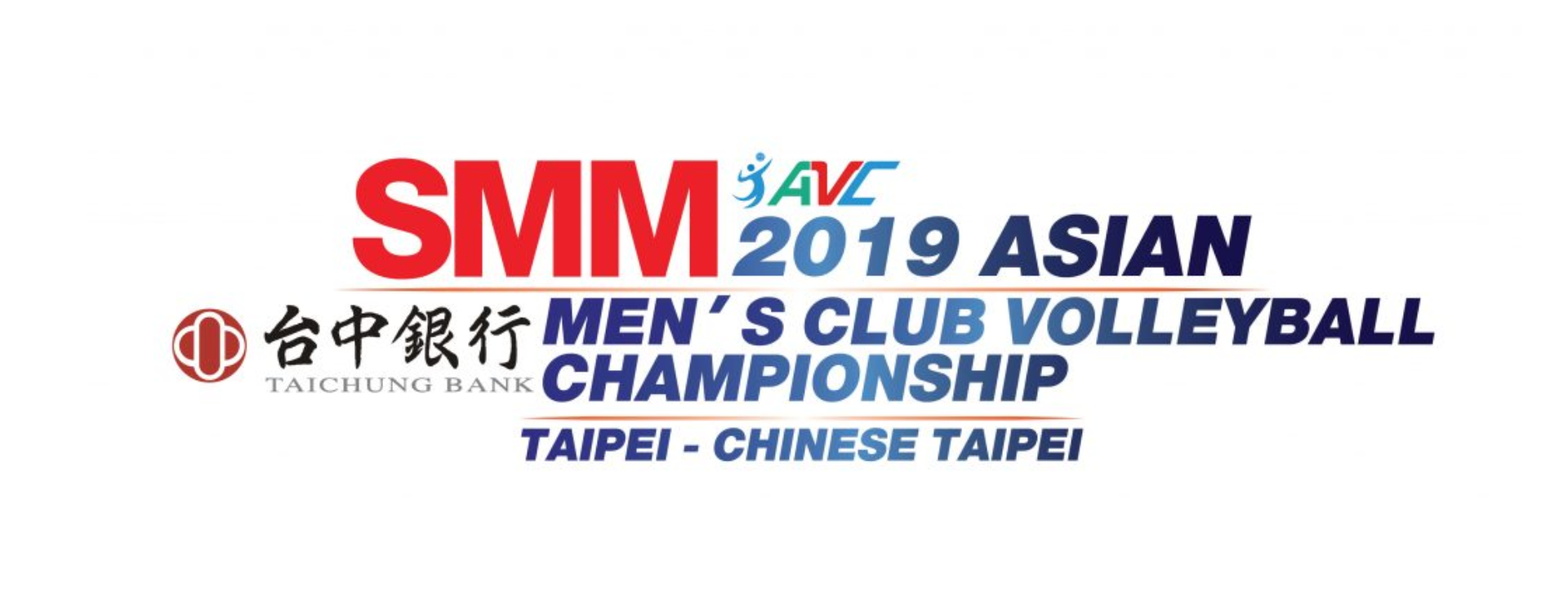

Tournament details
- Host country: Taiwan
- Dates: 18–26 April
- Teams: 14
- Venues: 2 (in 1 host city)

Final positions
- Champions: Shahrdari Varamin (2nd title)

Tournament awards
- MVP: Alireza Jalali

Tournament statistics
- Attendance: 30,501

The 2019 Asian Men's Club Volleyball Championship was the tenth edition of the Asian Men's Club Volleyball Championship, an annual international volleyball club tournament organised by the Asian Volleyball Confederation (AVC) with Chinese Taipei Volleyball Association (CTVA). The tournament was held in Taipei, Taiwan, from 18 to 26 April 2019. The champions qualified for the 2019 FIVB Volleyball Men's Club World Championship.

== Qualification ==
Following the AVC regulations, The maximum of 16 teams in all AVC events will be selected by

- 1 team for the organizer
- 10 teams based on the rankings of the previous championship
- 5 teams from each of 5 zones (with a qualification tournament if needed)

=== Qualified associations ===
Means of qualification	Date	Venue	Vacancies	Qualified
Host country	—N/a	—N/a	1	Chinese Taipei
2018 Asian Championship	30 July–6 August 2018	(Myanmar) Naypyidaw	9	Iran; Kazakhstan; Vietnam; Japan; Thailand; Sri Lanka; Australia (Hong Kong) Hong Kong^{A} (Turkmenistan) Turkmenistan^{A}
CAZVA representatives	2 February 2019	(Thailand) Bangkok	1	India
SEAZVA representatives	2 February 2019	(Thailand) Bangkok	2	Indonesia; Singapore
WAZVA representatives	2 February 2019	(Thailand) Bangkok	3	~~Iraq~~; ~~Kuwait~~; Qatar
Total			16	

== Participating teams ==
The following teams participated for the tournament.

Association	Team	Domestic league standing
Chinese Taipei	Taichung Bank	Hosts
Australia	Queensland Pirates	2018 Australian Volleyball League winners
Hong Kong	Dragon	2018 Hong Kong A1 Division Volleyball Championship Winners
India	Chennai Spartans	2019 Pro Volleyball League winners
Indonesia	Polri Samator	2019 Proliga winners
Iran	Shahrdari Varamin	2018–19 Iranian Volleyball Super League winners
Japan	Panasonic Panthers	2017–18 V.Premier League winners
Kazakhstan	TNC Kazchrome	2018–19 Kazakhstan National Liga winners
Qatar	Al-Rayyan	2017–18 Qatari Volleyball League winners
Singapore	Singapore Club	
Sri Lanka	Sri Lanka Ports Authority	2018 Munchee National Volleyball Championship
Thailand	Est Cola (Note: The 2018–19 Men's Volleyball Thailand League champions, Air Force withdrew. They were replaced by a league selection team.)	N/A (Thailand League selection)
Turkmenistan	Galkan	
Vietnam	TP.HCM	2018 Volleyball Vietnam League winners

== Pools composition ==
Pool A	Pool B	Pool C	Pool D
Chinese Taipei (Hosts/8)	Iran (1)	Kazakhstan (2)	Vietnam (4)
Australia (9)	Sri Lanka (7)	Thailand (6)	Japan (5)
~~Kuwait (–)~~	Turkmenistan (–)	Qatar (–)	~~Iraq (–)~~
Singapore (–)	Indonesia (–)	India (–)	Hong Kong (–)

== Pool standing procedure ==
1. Number of matches won
2. Match points
3. Sets ratio
4. Points ratio
5. If the tie continues as per the point ratio between two teams, the priority will be given to the team which won the last match between them. When the tie in points ratio is between three or more teams, a new classification of these teams in the terms of points 1, 2 and 3 will be made taking into consideration only the matches in which they were opposed to each other.

Match won 3–0 or 3–1: 3 match points for the winner, 0 match points for the loser
Match won 3–2: 2 match points for the winner, 1 match point for the loser

== Venues ==
- University of Taipei Gymnasium, Taipei, Taiwan
- National Taipei University of Education Gymnasium, Taipei, Taiwan

== Pool standing procedure ==
1. Number of matches won
2. Match points
3. Sets ratio
4. Points ratio
5. Result of the last match between the tied teams

Match won 3–0 or 3–1: 3 match points for the winner, 0 match points for the loser
Match won 3–2: 2 match points for the winner, 1 match point for the loser

== Preliminary round ==
- All times are Taiwan National Standard Time (UTC+08:00).

=== Pool A ===
Pos	Team	Pld	W	L	Pts	SW	SL	SR	SPW	SPL	SPR	Qualification
1	(Chinese Taipei) Taichung Bank	2	2	0	6	6	0	MAX	150	91	1.648	Pool E
2	(Australia) Queensland Pirates	2	1	1	3	3	4	0.750	144	164	0.878	Pool E
3	Club Singapore	2	0	2	0	1	6	0.167	129	186	0.694	Pool G

Date	Time		Score		Set 1	Set 2	Set 3	Set 4	Set 5	Total	Report
18 Apr	18:30	Queensland Pirates (Australia)	3–1	Club Singapore	18–25	25–19	25–22	25–23		93–89	P2
19 Apr	18:30	Taichung Bank (Chinese Taipei)	3–0	Club Singapore	25–14	25–14	25–12			75–40	P2
20 Apr	18:30	Taichung Bank (Chinese Taipei)	3–0	(Australia) Queensland Pirates	25–17	25–17	25–17			75–51	P2

=== Pool B ===
Pos	Team	Pld	W	L	Pts	SW	SL	SR	SPW	SPL	SPR	Qualification
1	(Iran) Shahrdari Varamin	3	3	0	9	9	2	4.500	266	217	1.226	Pool F
2	Sri Lanka Ports Authority	3	2	1	4	6	7	0.857	276	287	0.962	Pool F
3	(Indonesia) Polri Samator	3	1	2	4	6	7	0.857	293	287	1.021	Pool H
4	(Turkmenistan) Galkan	3	0	3	1	4	9	0.444	259	301	0.860	Pool H

Date	Time		Score		Set 1	Set 2	Set 3	Set 4	Set 5	Total	Report
18 Apr	16:00	Shahrdari Varamin (Iran)	3–1	(Indonesia) Polri Samator	25–19	25–20	21–25	25–21		96–85	P2
18 Apr	18:30	Sri Lanka Ports Authority	3–2	(Turkmenistan) Galkan	22–25	20–25	25–22	25–21	15–12	107–105	P2
19 Apr	16:00	Sri Lanka Ports Authority	3–2	(Indonesia) Polri Samator	20–25	25–22	26–24	24–26	15–10	110–107	P2
19 Apr	18:30	Shahrdari Varamin (Iran)	3–1	(Turkmenistan) Galkan	25–17	25–12	20–25	25–19		95–73	P2
20 Apr	16:00	Polri Samator (Indonesia)	3–1	(Turkmenistan) Galkan	22–25	25–16	25–15	27–25		99–81	P2
20 Apr	18:30	Shahrdari Varamin (Iran)	3–0	Sri Lanka Ports Authority	25–17	25–21	25–21			75–59	P2

=== Pool C ===
Pos	Team	Pld	W	L	Pts	SW	SL	SR	SPW	SPL	SPR	Qualification
1	(Qatar) Al-Rayyan	3	2	1	7	8	4	2.000	278	251	1.108	Pool E
2	(India) Chennai Spartans	3	2	1	4	6	7	0.857	270	279	0.968	Pool E
3	(Thailand) Est Cola	3	1	2	4	6	7	0.857	285	305	0.934	Pool G
4	(Kazakhstan) TNC Kazchrome	3	1	2	3	4	6	0.667	217	232	0.935	Pool G

Date	Time		Score		Set 1	Set 2	Set 3	Set 4	Set 5	Total	Report
18 Apr	13:30	TNC Kazchrome (Kazakhstan)	3–0	(India) Chennai Spartans	25–21	25–20	25–17			75–58	P2
18 Apr	16:00	Est Cola (Thailand)	1–3	(Qatar) Al-Rayyan	24–26	18–25	25–22	20–25		87–98	P2
19 Apr	13:30	TNC Kazchrome (Kazakhstan)	0–3	(Qatar) Al-Rayyan	26–28	14–25	23–25			63–78	P2
19 Apr	16:00	Est Cola (Thailand)	2–3	(India) Chennai Spartans	22–25	25–23	21–25	25–23	9–15	102–111	P2
20 Apr	13:30	Al-Rayyan (Qatar)	2–3	(India) Chennai Spartans	25–22	20–25	19–25	25–14	13–15	102–101	P2
20 Apr	16:00	TNC Kazchrome (Kazakhstan)	1–3	(Thailand) Est Cola	25–21	17–25	18–25	19–25		79–96	P2

=== Pool D ===
Pos	Team	Pld	W	L	Pts	SW	SL	SR	SPW	SPL	SPR	Qualification
1	(Japan) Panasonic Panthers	2	2	0	6	6	0	MAX	150	93	1.613	Pool F
2	(Vietnam) TP.HCM	2	1	1	3	3	3	1.000	126	128	0.984	Pool F
3	(Hong Kong) Dragon	2	0	2	0	0	6	0.000	95	150	0.633	Pool H

Date	Time		Score		Set 1	Set 2	Set 3	Set 4	Set 5	Total	Report
18 Apr	13:30	TP.HCM (Vietnam)	3–0	(Hong Kong) Dragon	25–20	25–16	25–17			75–53	P2
19 Apr	13:30	Panasonic Panthers (Japan)	3–0	(Hong Kong) Dragon	25–12	25–14	25–16			75–42	P2
20 Apr	11:00	TP.HCM (Vietnam)	0–3	(Japan) Panasonic Panthers	22–25	14–25	15–25			51–75	P2

== Classification round ==
- All times are Taiwan National Standard Time (UTC+08:00).
- The results and the points of the matches between the same teams that were already played during the preliminary round shall be taken into account for the classification round.

=== Pool E ===
Pos	Team	Pld	W	L	Pts	SW	SL	SR	SPW	SPL	SPR	Qualification
1	(India) Chennai Spartans	3	3	0	7	9	4	2.250	286	251	1.139	Quarterfinals
2	(Qatar) Al-Rayyan	3	2	1	7	8	4	2.000	274	233	1.176	Quarterfinals
3	(Chinese Taipei) Taichung Bank	3	1	2	4	6	6	1.000	245	259	0.946	Quarterfinals
4	(Australia) Queensland Pirates	3	0	3	0	0	9	0.000	162	225	0.720	Quarterfinals

Date	Time		Score		Set 1	Set 2	Set 3	Set 4	Set 5	Total	Report
21 Apr	16:00	Al-Rayyan (Qatar)	3–0	(Australia) Queensland Pirates	25–21	25–17	25–21			75–59	P2
21 Apr	18:30	Taichung Bank (Chinese Taipei)	2–3	(India) Chennai Spartans	25–23	16–25	25–23	20–25	11–15	97–111	P2
22 Apr	16:00	Queensland Pirates (Australia)	0–3	(India) Chennai Spartans	15–25	19–25	18–25			52–75	P2
22 Apr	18:30	Taichung Bank (Chinese Taipei)	1–3	(Qatar) Al-Rayyan	16–25	17–25	25–22	15–25		73–97	P2

=== Pool F ===
Pos	Team	Pld	W	L	Pts	SW	SL	SR	SPW	SPL	SPR	Qualification
1	(Japan) Panasonic Panthers	3	3	0	8	9	2	4.500	252	211	1.194	Quarterfinals
2	(Iran) Shahrdari Varamin	3	2	1	7	8	3	2.667	245	223	1.099	Quarterfinals
3	Sri Lanka Ports Authority	3	1	2	3	3	7	0.429	219	241	0.909	Quarterfinals
4	(Vietnam) TP.HCM	3	0	3	0	1	9	0.111	204	245	0.833	Quarterfinals

Date	Time		Score		Set 1	Set 2	Set 3	Set 4	Set 5	Total	Report
21 Apr	11:00	Shahrdari Varamin (Iran)	3–0	(Vietnam) TP.HCM	25–22	25–20	25–20			75–62	P2
21 Apr	13:30	Panasonic Panthers (Japan)	3–0	Sri Lanka Ports Authority	25–21	25–23	25–21			75–65	P2
22 Apr	11:00	Sri Lanka Ports Authority	3–1	(Vietnam) TP.HCM	25–21	18–25	25–20	27–25		95–91	P2
22 Apr	13:30	Shahrdari Varamin (Iran)	2–3	(Japan) Panasonic Panthers	19–25	25–19	12–25	25–17	14–16	95–102	P2

=== Pool G ===
Pos	Team	Pld	W	L	Pts	SW	SL	SR	SPW	SPL	SPR	Qualification
1	(Thailand) Est Cola	2	2	0	6	6	1	6.000	171	120	1.425	9th–12th semifinals
2	(Kazakhstan) TNC Kazchrome	2	1	1	3	4	3	1.333	154	132	1.167	9th–12th semifinals
3	Club Singapore	2	0	2	0	0	6	0.000	77	150	0.513	13th place match

Date	Time		Score		Set 1	Set 2	Set 3	Set 4	Set 5	Total	Report
21 Apr	16:00	Club Singapore	0–3	(Kazakhstan) TNC Kazchrome	14–25	18–25	4–25			36–75	P2
22 Apr	16:00	Club Singapore	0–3	(Thailand) Est Cola	14–25	13–25	14–25			41–75	P2

=== Pool H ===
Pos	Team	Pld	W	L	Pts	SW	SL	SR	SPW	SPL	SPR	Qualification
1	(Indonesia) Polri Samator	2	2	0	6	6	1	6.000	175	141	1.241	9th–12th semifinals
2	(Turkmenistan) Galkan	2	1	1	2	4	5	0.800	183	199	0.920	9th–12th semifinals
3	(Hong Kong) Dragon	2	0	2	1	2	6	0.333	160	178	0.899	13th place match

Date	Time		Score		Set 1	Set 2	Set 3	Set 4	Set 5	Total	Report
21 Apr	18:30	Dragon (Hong Kong)	2–3	(Turkmenistan) Galkan	21–25	25–19	18–25	25–18	11–15	100–102	P2
22 Apr	18:30	Polri Samator (Indonesia)	3–0	(Hong Kong) Dragon	25–19	26–24	25–17			76–60	P2

== Final round ==
- All times are Taiwan National Standard Time (UTC+08:00).

=== 13th–14th places ===
==== 13th place match ====
Date	Time		Score		Set 1	Set 2	Set 3	Set 4	Set 5	Total	Report
24 Apr	13:30	Club Singapore	1–3	(Hong Kong) Dragon	22–25	23–25	25–17	20–25		90–92	P2

=== 9th–12th places ===
9th–12th semifinals
24 April
(Thailand) Est Cola	3
(Turkmenistan) Galkan	2
24 April
(Indonesia) Polri Samator	3
(Kazakhstan) TNC Kazchrome	1

9th place match
25 April
(Thailand) Est Cola	1
(Indonesia) Polri Samator	3
11th place match
25 April
(Turkmenistan) Galkan	2
(Kazakhstan) TNC Kazchrome	3

==== 9th–12th semifinals ====
Date	Time		Score		Set 1	Set 2	Set 3	Set 4	Set 5	Total	Report
24 Apr	16:00	Est Cola (Thailand)	3–2	(Turkmenistan) Galkan	25–16	24–26	25–22	19–25	15–6	108–95	P2
24 Apr	18:30	Polri Samator (Indonesia)	3–1	(Kazakhstan) TNC Kazchrome	26–24	19–25	25–22	25–22		95–93	P2

==== 11th place match ====
Date	Time		Score		Set 1	Set 2	Set 3	Set 4	Set 5	Total	Report
25 Apr	16:00	Galkan (Turkmenistan)	2–3	(Kazakhstan) TNC Kazchrome	21–25	20–25	25–22	31–29	8–15	105–116	P2

==== 9th place match ====
Date	Time		Score		Set 1	Set 2	Set 3	Set 4	Set 5	Total	Report
25 Apr	18:30	Est Cola (Thailand)	1–3	(Indonesia) Polri Samator	21–25	25–19	19–25	21–25		86–94	P2

=== Final eight ===
Quarterfinals
24 April
(Japan) Panasonic Panthers	3
(Australia) Queensland Pirates	0
24 April
(Qatar) Al-Rayyan	3
Sri Lanka Ports Authority	0
24 April
(India) Chennai Spartans	3
(Vietnam) TP.HCM	0
24 April
(Iran) Shahrdari Varamin	3
(Chinese Taipei) Taichung Bank	0

Semifinals
25 April
(Japan) Panasonic Panthers	3
(Qatar) Al-Rayyan	2
25 April
(India) Chennai Spartans	1
(Iran) Shahrdari Varamin	3

Final
26 April
(Japan) Panasonic Panthers	2
(Iran) Shahrdari Varamin	3
3rd place match
26 April
(Qatar) Al-Rayyan	3
(India) Chennai Spartans	0

5th–8th semifinals
25 April
(Australia) Queensland Pirates	1
Sri Lanka Ports Authority	3
25 April
(Vietnam) TP.HCM	0
(Chinese Taipei) Taichung Bank	3

5th place match
26 April
Sri Lanka Ports Authority	3
(Chinese Taipei) Taichung Bank	2
7th place match
26 April
(Australia) Queensland Pirates	2
(Vietnam) TP.HCM	3

==== Quarterfinals ====
Date	Time		Score		Set 1	Set 2	Set 3	Set 4	Set 5	Total	Report
24 Apr	11:00	Panasonic Panthers (Japan)	3–0	(Australia) Queensland Pirates	25–14	25–18	25–9			75–41	P2
24 Apr	13:30	Chennai Spartans (India)	3–0	(Vietnam) TP.HCM	25–21	25–18	25–21			75–60	P2
24 Apr	16:00	Al-Rayyan (Qatar)	3–0	Sri Lanka Ports Authority	25–14	25–22	25–12			75–48	P2
24 Apr	18:30	Shahrdari Varamin (Iran)	3–0	(Chinese Taipei) Taichung Bank	25–20	25–15	25–20			75–55	P2

==== 5th–8th semifinals ====
Date	Time		Score		Set 1	Set 2	Set 3	Set 4	Set 5	Total	Report
25 Apr	11:00	Queensland Pirates (Australia)	1–3	Sri Lanka Ports Authority	22–25	17–25	31–29	21–25		91–104	P2
25 Apr	13:30	TP.HCM (Vietnam)	0–3	(Chinese Taipei) Taichung Bank	21–25	22–25	21–25			64–75	P2

==== Semifinals ====
Date	Time		Score		Set 1	Set 2	Set 3	Set 4	Set 5	Total	Report
25 Apr	16:00	Panasonic Panthers (Japan)	3–2	(Qatar) Al-Rayyan	19–25	25–19	25–23	19–25	15–9	103–101	P2
25 Apr	18:30	Chennai Spartans (India)	1–3	(Iran) Shahrdari Varamin	23–25	22–25	25–22	25–27		95–99	P2

==== 7th place match ====
Date	Time		Score		Set 1	Set 2	Set 3	Set 4	Set 5	Total	Report
26 Apr	11:00	Queensland Pirates (Australia)	2–3	(Vietnam) TP.HCM	25–22	22–25	24–26	25–21	11–15	107–109	P2

==== 5th place match ====
Date	Time		Score		Set 1	Set 2	Set 3	Set 4	Set 5	Total	Report
26 Apr	13:30	Taichung Bank (Chinese Taipei)	2–3	Sri Lanka Ports Authority	16–25	25–20	24–26	25–19	9–15	99–105	P2

==== 3rd place match ====
Date	Time		Score		Set 1	Set 2	Set 3	Set 4	Set 5	Total	Report
26 Apr	16:00	Al-Rayyan (Qatar)	3–0	(India) Chennai Spartans	25–23	25–19	25–16			75–58	P2

==== Final ====
Date	Time		Score		Set 1	Set 2	Set 3	Set 4	Set 5	Total	Report
26 Apr	18:30	Panasonic Panthers (Japan)	2–3	(Iran) Shahrdari Varamin	25–20	25–16	22–25	20–25	14–16	106–102	P2

== Final standing ==
Rank	Team
1st place, gold medalist(s)	(Iran) Shahrdari Varamin
2nd place, silver medalist(s)	(Japan) Panasonic Panthers
3rd place, bronze medalist(s)	(Qatar) Al-Rayyan
4	(India) Chennai Spartans
5	Sri Lanka Ports Authority
6	(Chinese Taipei) Taichung Bank
7	(Vietnam) TP.HCM
8	(Australia) Queensland Pirates
9	(Indonesia) Polri Samator
10	(Thailand) Est Cola
11	(Kazakhstan) TNC Kazchrome
12	(Turkmenistan) Galkan
13	(Hong Kong) Dragon
14	Club Singapore

Qualified for the 2019 Club World Championship

2019 Asian Men's Club Champions

2nd title

== Awards ==
- Most valuable player
  (Iran) Alireza Jalali (Shahrdari Varamin)
- Best setter
  (Iran) Parviz Pezeshki (Shahrdari Varamin)
- Best outside spikers
  (Poland) Michał Kubiak (Panasonic Panthers)
  (Brazil) Marcus Costa (Al-Rayyan)
- Best middle blockers
  (Iran) Mohammad Razipour (Shahrdari Varamin)
  (India) Ashwal Rai (Chennai Spartans)
- Best opposite spiker
  (Japan) Kunihiro Shimizu (Panasonic Panthers)
- Best libero
  (Japan) Takeshi Nagano (Panasonic Panthers)

== See also ==
- List of sporting events in Taiwan
