= Sport in Chennai =

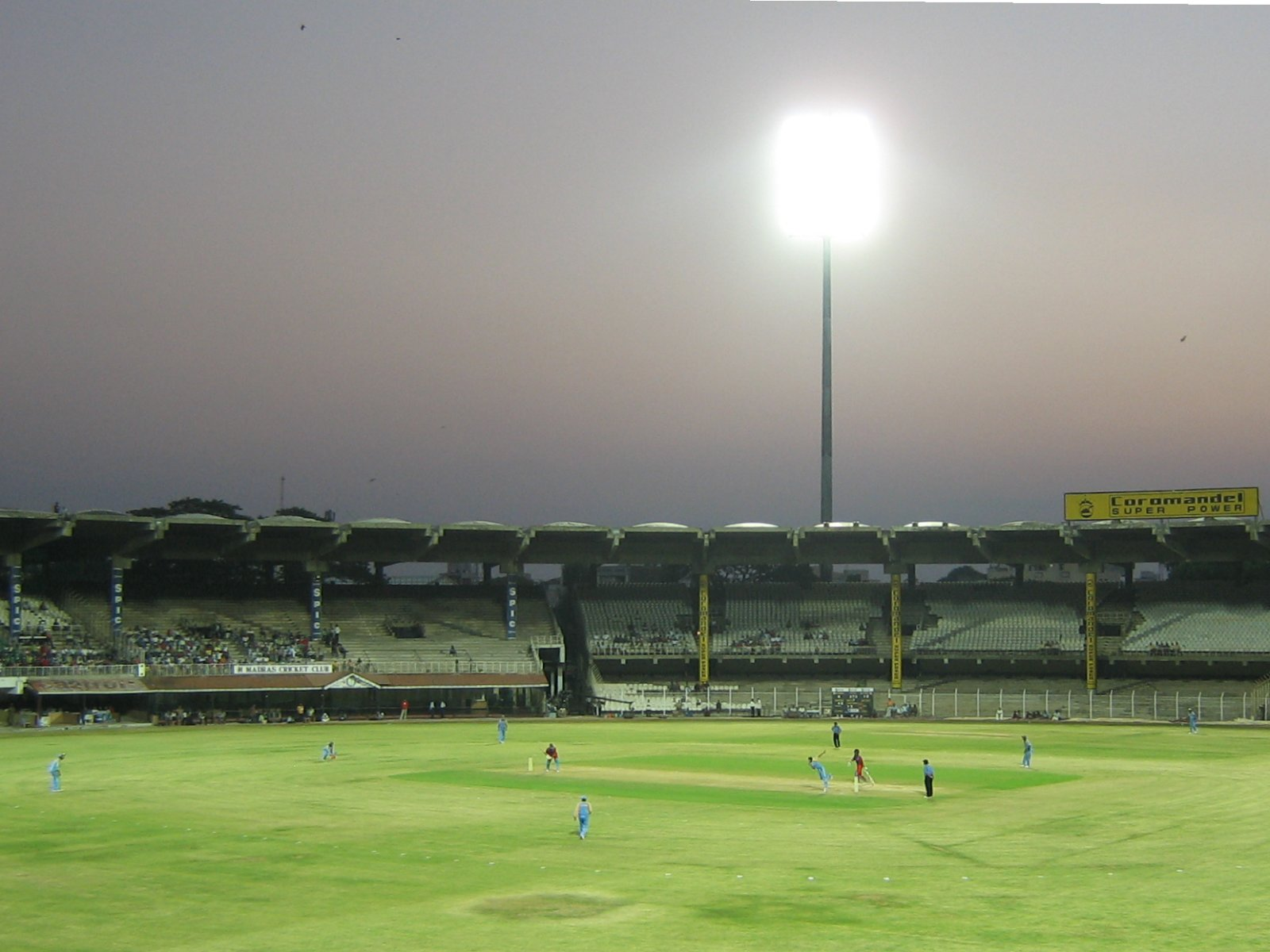
Cricket match between India Blue and India Red at the M. A. Chidambaram Cricket Stadium, Chennai, India.

Cricket is amongst the popular sports in Chennai. The M. A. Chidambaram Stadium is one of the oldest cricket stadiums in India and has been the venue for many notable milestones in the history of Indian cricket. Other sports played include tennis, field hockey, football, motor racing and squash. Chennai has a rich legacy in chess and has produced many well-known chess players, the most notable of them being Viswanathan Anand.

== Cricket ==
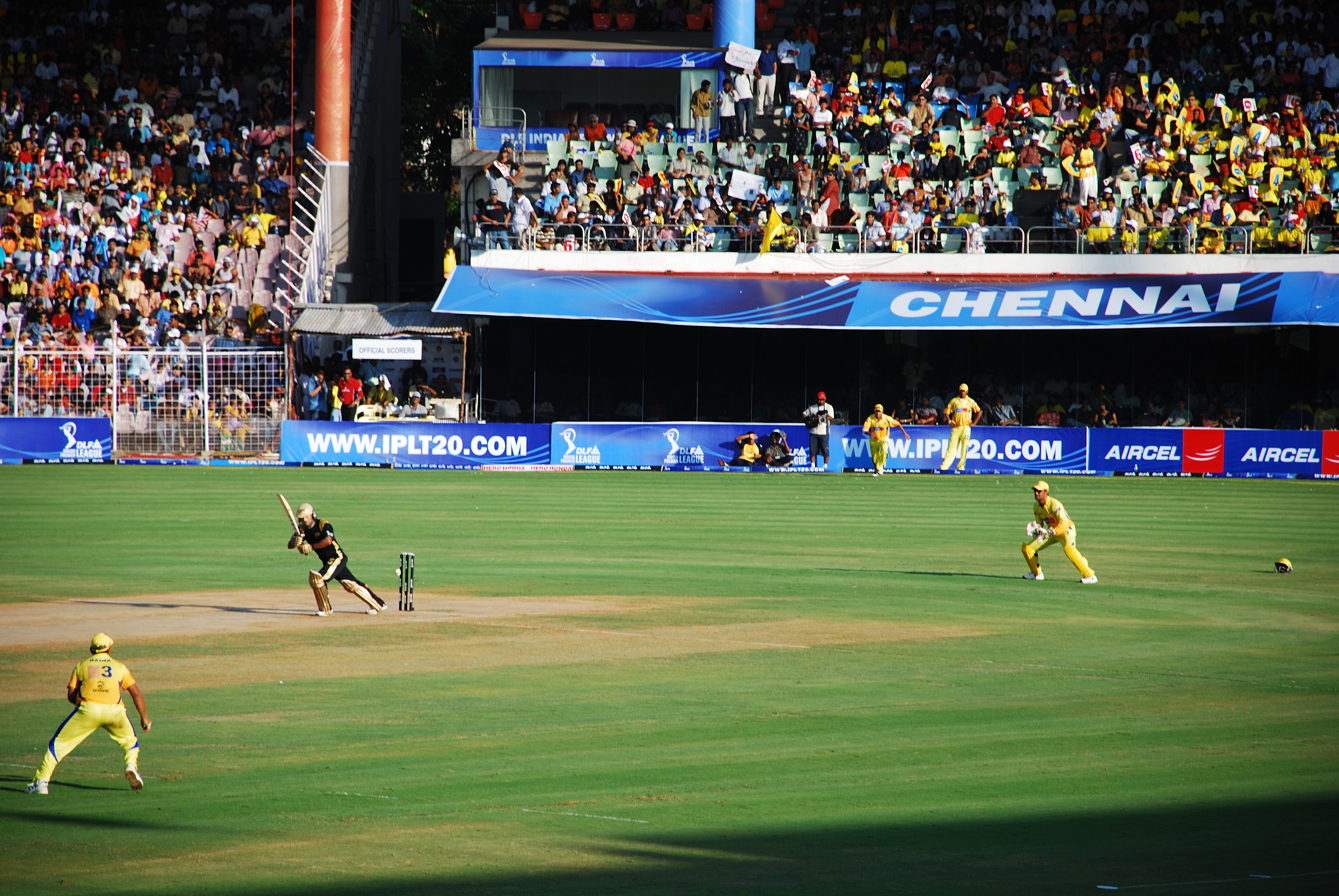
An IPL match in progress at M.A. Chidambaram Cricket Stadium

Cricket is the most popular sport in Chennai. The M. A. Chidambaram Stadium (formerly known as Madras Cricket Club ground or Chepauk Stadium) in Chepauk and popularly called the MAC, is one of the oldest cricket stadiums in India built in 1916. It seats more than 50,000 and is home to the Tamil Nadu Cricket Association and the Chennai Super Kings IPL franchise. The stadium is famous for its list of records, including the first ever test match victory that India recorded in 1951–52 when they defeated England, the second of only two tied tests between India and Australia in 1986 and Saeed Anwar's 194 in 1999 which is the third highest ODI score by a batsman. Prominent cricketers from Chennai include former Test-captains S. Venkataraghavan and Kris Srikkanth, Laxman Sivaramakrishnan, Sadagoppan Ramesh, Murali Karthik, Lakshmipathy Balaji, Murali Vijay, Ravichandran Ashwin, Dinesh Karthik, Vijay Shankar and Washington Sundar . Cricket administrators from Chennai include former BCCI presidents M. A. Chidambaram and A. C. Muthiah. The internationally renowned cricket bowling academy, the MRF Pace Foundation under the directorship of famous fast bowler Glenn McGrath is based in Chennai. Chennai Super Kings, a franchise based in Chennai is the most successful team in the Indian Premier League. It is also home to Chepauk Super Gillies, a popular Tamil Nadu Premier League franchise.

== Tennis ==
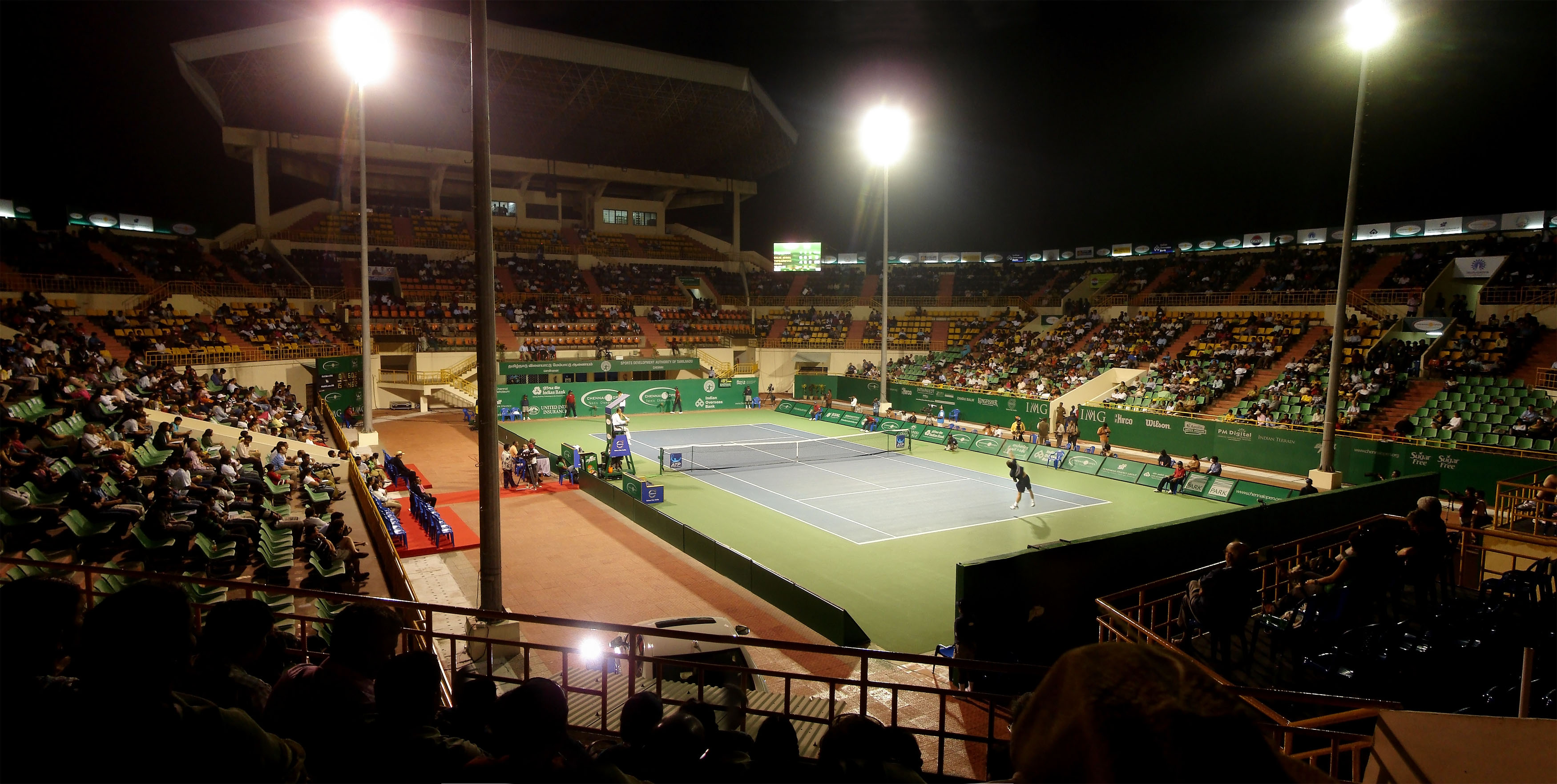
ATP Chennai Open - Centre Court at the SDAT Tennis Stadium complex in Nungambakkam

Tennis is another popular game in Chennai. The city hosted the country's only ATP event, the now defunct Chennai Open, from 1996 to 2017 at the SDAT Tennis Stadium in Nungambakkam. The stadium seats about 6,000 spectators and has five synthetic surface courts. The tournament was awarded the title of the best new event in its second year by the Association of Tennis Professionals. Indian tennis stars such as Ramanathan Krishnan, Vijay Amritraj, Ramesh Krishnan and Mahesh Bhupathi hail from Chennai. Leander Paes did his schooling and was trained in Chennai. One of India's top tennis training academies, the Britannia Amritraj Tennis Academy is based in Chennai.

== Basketball ==
Chennai is home to Chennai Slam, two-time national champion of India's top professional basketball division, the UBA Pro Basketball League.

== Hockey ==
The Mayor Radhakrishnan Stadium, with a seating capacity of 4000, is the venue for hockey matches in the city. The stadium has twice hosted the Champions Trophy, featuring the top six teams in the world, in 1996 and 2005. Chennai is home to the World Series Hockey team Chennai Cheetahs since 2011. It was also the home of the defunct Premiere Hockey League team Chennai Veerans. Notable international players include Vasudevan Baskaran, Krishnamurthy Perumal, M. J. Gopalan and Mohammed Riaz.

== Squash ==
The Squash Rackets Federation of India (SRFI) is headquartered in Chennai. It has more than 20 State Associations and affiliated units. Dipika Pallikal, India's top ranked women's squash player hails from Chennai.

== Racing ==
=== Motorsports ===
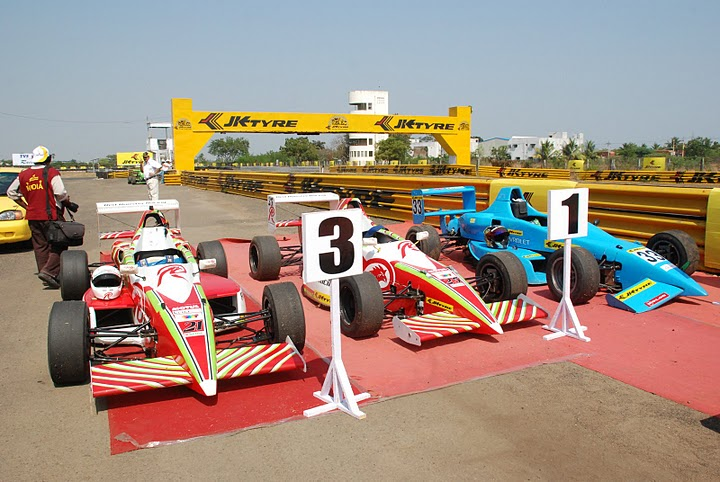
Formula Rolons at MMSC race track

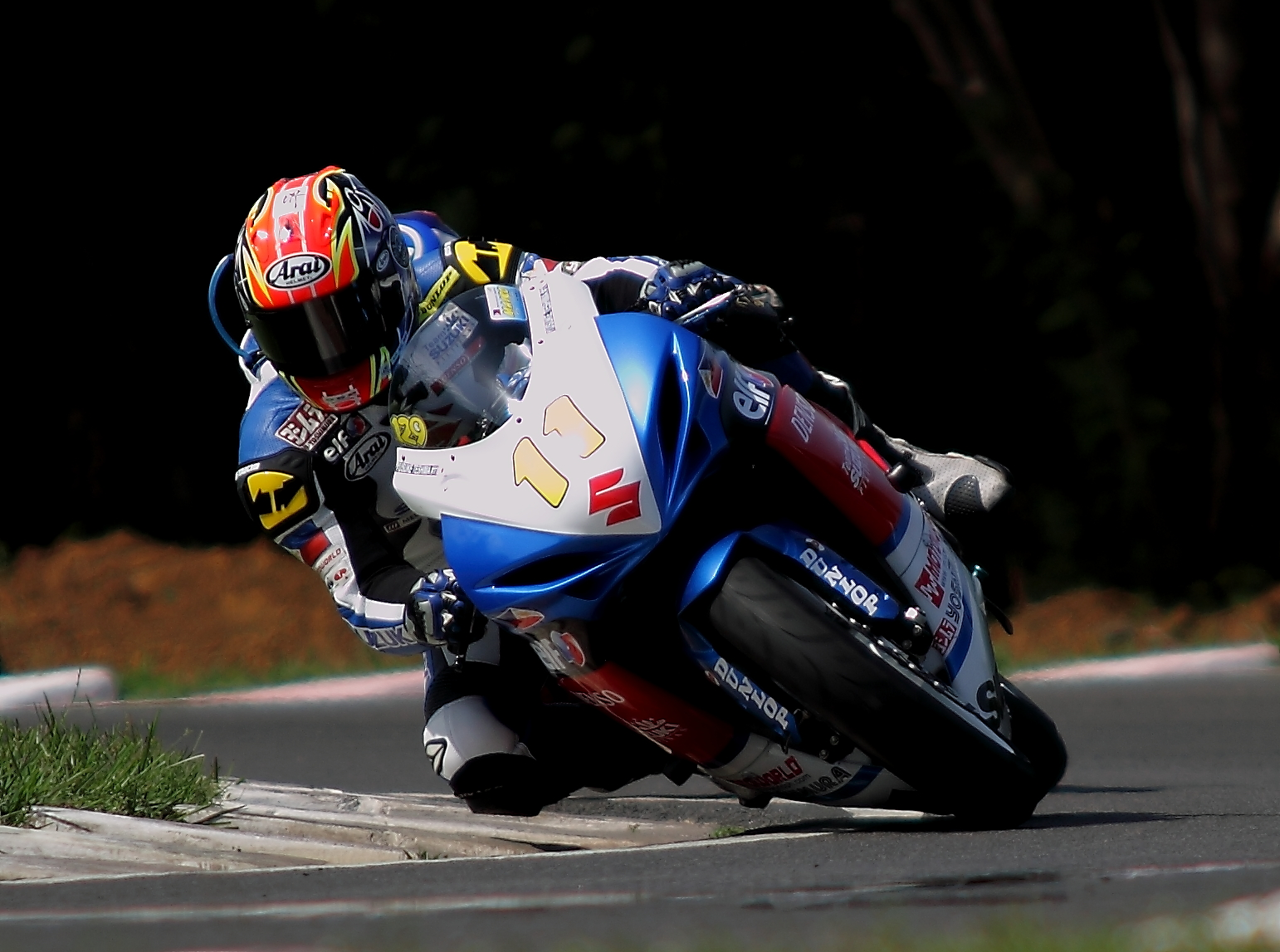
AARC Championship racing

Chennai has a long-standing and thriving motorsport culture. Madras Motor Racing Track, Chennai was one of only two permanent race ways in India along with Kari Motor Speedway, Coimbatore before the construction of Buddh International Circuit in 2011. Madras Rubber Factory based out of Chennai built is first Formula 3 car in 1997. MRF in collaboration with Maruti established the Formula Maruti racing, a single-seater, open wheel class motorsport racing event for race cars made in India. MRF Challenge is a Formula 2000 open-wheel motorsport formula based series organized by Madras Motor Sports Club in association with MRF. Narain Karthikeyan and Karun Chandhok, the only drivers from to represent India in Formula 1 were born in Chennai. Motor racing events are held at the Sriperumbudur track for cars and the Sholavaram track for motorcycles. Races of the FISSME class, 1300 CC class and 1600 CC class are held regularly in Irungattukottai.

=== Horse racing ===
The Guindy Race Course for horse racing was set up in 1777. The city also has a pigeon-racing culture that started in the 1970s and now has 11 clubs and 400 racing enthusiasts.

== Football ==
Football is a popular sport in schools. Football matches are played at Jawaharlal Nehru Stadium in Chennai. The Indian Super League team Chennaiyin FC, and former I-League winning club Chennai City FC are based in Chennai. The city is also home of another football club Indian Bank RC, that previously competed in the National Football League.

On the 5th of February 2019, it was reported in both the Swiss and Indian newspapers that Chennai City FC (CCFC) are all set to sell 35 per cent of the club's stake to Swiss club FC Basel. The Swiss Champions League regulars will also invest 20m euros in CCFC. FC Basel will also have a player exchange program, including first team players, with CCFC and help the club with technical know how.

== Athletics and aquatics ==
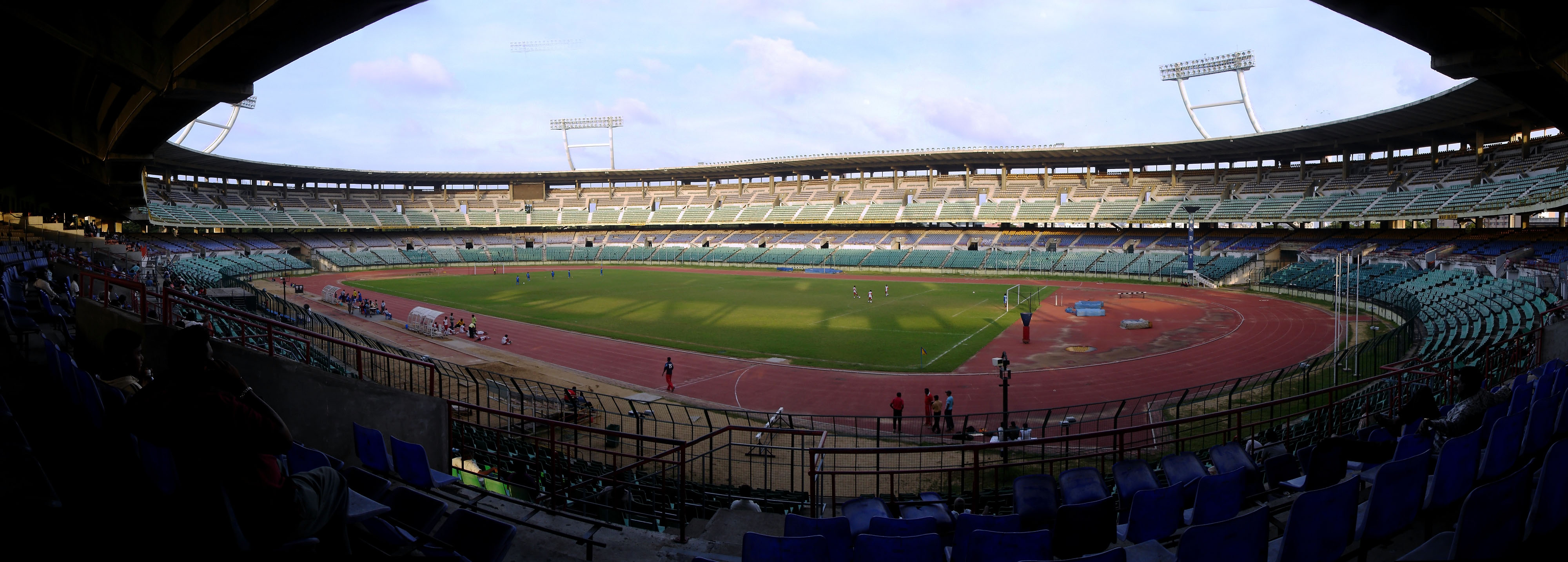
Jawaharlal Nehru Stadium

Athletic competitions are held at the Jawaharlal Nehru Stadium, which seats 40,000. The complex also houses a multipurpose indoor stadium with a seating capacity of 8,000 which hosts various competitions including volleyball, basketball and table tennis. The Velachery Aquatic Complex seats 4,000 and hosts various water sports. Chennai was the venue of the SAF Games in 1995.

== Chess ==
Chess is a popular board game in the city. It has been called the "Mecca of Chess" in India, producing more grandmasters than any other city in India. Most popularly, Viswanathan Anand, the five-time world chess champion, is from Chennai. It is the hometown of prominent coaches Ramesh RB, five-time olympiad team captain, and Srinath Narayanan, three-time olympiad team captain (twice in online olympiad). Manuel Aaron, India's first International Master, and S. Vijayalakshmi, India's first Woman Grandmaster (WGM), both hail from Chennai. It is home to super-GMs Krishnan Sasikiran, Adhiban Baskaran, and young talents R Praggnanandhaa and D Gukesh.

Other national champions from Chennai are Aravindh Chithambaram, Karthikeyan Murali, S. P. Sethuraman, and G. Akash in the open section, and Aarthie Ramaswamy in the women's section.

== Other ==
Chennai is home to popular Table tennis players Sharath Kamal and Subramanian Raman, both gold medalists at the Commonwealth Games and winners of the Arjuna award. The Chennai Sepak Takraw League is a major attraction in Chennai for the sport of Sepak Takraw, players from Tamil Nadu participate in four teams in this league. The Tamil Nadu men's team is one of the leading teams in India and many players from Tamil Nadu have represented India.

Chennai is home to a rugby union team called the Chennai Cheetahs and was founded in 1997 by four software professionals. It was All India Champion in 2004 and 2006 and also won the All India sevens in 2005 and the South India ten in 2007. India's only Arjuna awardee for Carrom and two-time world champion, Maria Irudayam and the present women's world champion Ilavazhagi are natives of Chennai. There is also a growing enthusiasm in Parkour & Freerunning which is fueled by the "Chennai Parkour" and "Parkour Circle" groups. The Madras Boat Club, founded in 1867, hosts rowing competitions.

The city has two 18-hole golf courses: the Cosmopolitan Club and the Gymkhana Club golf course, both of which were established in the late 19th century. Private golf courses include the proposed one at Hirco Palace Gardens at Oragadam, a western suburb of Chennai, which features an architectural canopy to protect the golfers from sun and rain and a combination of Par 3,4 and 5 holes each with its unique combination of bunker, water and vegetation hazards. The 50-acre course stretches out to over 2,500 meters (an 18-hole equivalent of 5000 meters/5500 yards). Chennai was the venue for the first Commonwealth Junior Fencing Championships held in 2006.

== Teams ==
Club	Sport	League	Home stadium	Span	Source
Chennai Superstarz	Badminton	Premier Badminton League	Jawaharlal Nehru Indoor Stadium	2015	
Chennai Slam	Basketball	UBA Pro Basketball League	Jawaharlal Nehru Indoor Stadium	2015–2017	
Chennai Superstars	Cricket	Indian Cricket League	M.A. Chidambaram Stadium	2007–2009	
Chennai Super Kings	Cricket	Indian Premier League	M.A. Chidambaram Stadium	2008–present	
Chepauk Super Gillies	Cricket	Tamil Nadu Premier League	M.A. Chidambaram Stadium	2016–present	
Chennai Strikers	Cue Sports	Indian Cue Masters League	–	2017	
Chennai Veerans	Field hockey	Premier Hockey League	Mayor Radhakrishnan Stadium	2005–2008	
Chennai Cheetahs	Field hockey	World Series Hockey	Mayor Radhakrishnan Stadium	2011–2012	
Tamil Nadu Dragons	Hockey	Hockey India League	Mayor Radhakrishnan Hockey Stadium	2024	
Chennai City F.C.	Football	I-league	Jawaharlal Nehru Stadium	2016–2019	
Chennaiyin FC	Football	Indian Super League	Jawaharlal Nehru Stadium	2013–Present	
Tamil Thalaivas	Kabaddi	Pro Kabaddi	Jawaharlal Nehru Indoor Stadium	2017–Present	
V Chennai Warriors	Tennis	Champions Tennis League	SDAT Tennis Stadium	2015	
Chennai Lions	Table tennis	Ultimate Table Tennis	Jawaharlal Nehru Indoor Stadium	2019–present	
Chennai Spikers	Volleyball	Indian Volley League	Jawaharlal Nehru Indoor Stadium	2011–2012	
Chennai Spartans	Volleyball	Pro Volleyball League	Jawaharlal Nehru Indoor Stadium	2019	
Chennai Blitz	Volleyball	Prime Volleyball League	Jawaharlal Nehru Indoor Stadium	2021–present	
Chennai Quick Guns	Kho-kho	Ultimate Kho Kho	Jawaharlal Nehru Indoor Stadium	2022–2024	
Chennai Bulls	Rugby sevens	Rugby Premier League	–	2025-present	
