= Viva Chennai FC =

Indian association football club based in Chennai

Viva Chennai
- Full name: Viva Chennai Football Club
- Short name: VCFC
- Ground: Jawaharlal Nehru Stadium (Chennai)
- Capacity: 40,000
- Head coach: C. M. Renjith
- League: CFA Senior Division
Home colours	Away colours

Viva Chennai Football Club is an Indian professional football club based in Chennai, Tamil Nadu that competes in the CFA Senior Division of the Chennai Football League. Viva Chennai won the 2022 CFA Senior Division.

== History ==
Viva Chennai Football Club was formed after C.M. Renjit took over Star Juvenile club from the previous owner. The club was renamed when it joined the CFA Super Division league after 2 years. Currently the club is owned by V.C. Praveen, president of Gokulam Kerala FC.

"There are a lot of talented players in Tamil Nadu. But we don't have any proper tournaments apart from the CFA league here. So a lot of players lose interest and don't want to take up football seriously. We want to give them that platform. Our aim is to play in the I-League. We could have directly bid for a team next year but then we wanted to take the difficult path of qualifying through second division. This will be a great chance for the talented players to prove themselves."

— C.M. Renjith, co-owner and head coach of Viva Chennai, on the club's aim to play I-League.

Viva Chennai won the CFA Super Division in 2022, making it biggest club achievement.

== Honours ==
=== Domestic league ===
- Chennai Football League
  - Champions (1): 2022

== Notable players ==
- Srinivas Pandiyan
- Lenin Mithran
- Kivi Zhimomi
- Seikhohau Tuboi
- Orok Essien

== Affiliated club(s) ==
The following club is currently affiliated with Viva Chennai FC:

- Gokulam Kerala FC (2018–present)

== See also ==
- Football clubs in Chennai
- Sport in Chennai
