= Chennai Football League =

Indian football league group

- Organising body: Chennai Football Association
- Founded: 1934; 92 years ago (as Madras Football League)
- Country: India
- Number of clubs: 12
- Level on pyramid: 5–9
- Promotion to: I-League 3
- Relegation to: Various
- Domestic cup(s): Vittal Trophy; TFA Shield
- Current champions: AGORC (2025–26)

The Chennai Football League, formerly known as the Madras Football League, is the group of state-level football leagues in the Indian state of Tamil Nadu, including the top-level CFA Senior Division League. The League is organised by the Chennai Football Association (CFA), which is affiliated to the Tamil Nadu Football Association (TNFA), the official football governing body of the state.

== History ==
The Madras Football Association was formed on 26 October 1933, with had the jurisdiction over the undivided province of Madras in British India. It was formed by the members of the Madras United Club. The Madras Football Association league championship was started in 1934 with the inaugural 1934-35 league championship won by the Pachaiyappa football club. The MFA started conducting the First division league from 1936, and the Second division from 1937. In the year of 1972, Madras city clubs formed a separate association and the federation became a part of the Tamil Nadu Football Association.

The league was suspended since the 2018 edition due to the legal disputes between Chennai FA and Tamil Nadu FA, but eventually resumed in 2022.

== Competition structure ==
There are five divisions in the league under the Chennai Football Association (CFA), with the CFA Senior Division being the top-most league, followed by four lower tiers.

Chennai Football League
| Tier | Division |
|---|---|
| 1 _{(5 on Indian Football pyramid)} | CFA Senior Division _{↑promote (to I-League 3) ↓relegate} |
| 2 _{(6 on Indian Football pyramid)} | CFA First Division _{↑promote ↓relegate} |
| 3 _{(7 on Indian Football pyramid)} | CFA Second Division _{↑promote ↓relegate} |
| 4 _{(8 on Indian Football pyramid)} | CFA Third Division _{↑promote ↓relegate} |
| 5 _{(9 on Indian Football pyramid)} | CFA Fourth Division _{↑promote} |

== Venue ==
The matches are held at Nehru Stadium and ICF Stadium.

== Clubs ==
=== 2025–26 season ===
The teams participating in the 2025–26 season:

| No. | Team |
|---|---|
| 1 | AGORC |
| 2 | Central Excise |
| 3 | Chennai City Police |
| 4 | Chennai Customs |
| 5 | Dawood Memorial FC |
| 6 | DBYC Kilpauk |
| 7 | ICF |
| 8 | Income Tax |
| 9 | Indian Bank |
| 10 | Octopus Marine |
| 11 | Tamil Nadu Police |
| 12 | Thalapathi Stalin FC |

== Champions ==
| Season | Champion |
|---|---|
| 1934–35 | Pachaiyappa FC |
| 1936–1949 | No data |
| 1950 | WIMCO (Western India Match Company) |
| 1951 | WIMCO |
| 1952 | WIMCO |
| 1953 | WIMCO |
| 1954 | WIMCO |
| 1955 | WIMCO |
| 1956–1969 | No data |
| 1970 | SBI |
| 1971–1974 | No data |
| 1975 | WIMCO |
| 1976 | WIMCO |
| 1977–1987 | No data |
| 1988 | Southern Railway |
| 1989–1992 | No data |
| 1993 | ICF (Integral Coach Factory) |
| 1994 | ICF |
| 1995 | ICF |
| 1996 | No data |
| 1997 | Indian Bank |
| 1998 | Indian Bank |
| 1999–2000 | No data |
| 2000–01 | Indian Bank |
| 2001–02 | AGORC |
| 2002–03 | Indian Bank |
| 2003–04 | Madras Sporting Union |
| 2004–05 | ICF |
| 2005–06 | ICF |
| 2006–07 | ICF |
| 2007–08 | Indian Bank |
| 2008–09 | Nethaji SC |
| 2009–10 | Chennai Customs |
| 2010–11 | AGORC |
| 2011–12 | Chennai Customs |
| 2012–13 | Arrows |
| 2013–14 | ICF |
| 2014–15 | Hindustan Eagles |
| 2015–16 | Disputed |
| 2016–17 | Chennai City |
| 2017–18 | Indian Bank |
| 2018–21 | League suspended (CFA-TNFA dispute) |
| 2021–22 | Viva Chennai |
| 2022–23 | Swaraj FC |
| 2023–24 | Not held |
| 2024–25 | ICF |
| 2025–26 | AGORC |

== See also ==
- Tamil Nadu Football Association
- All India Sevens Football
