= Team Est Cola =

Team Est Cola may refer to a group of teams sponsored by Est Cola which represent Thailand in international competitions including:

- Team Est Cola (men)
- Team Est Cola (women)
