= Chennai Football Association =

Indian sports governing body

- Sport: Football
- Jurisdiction: District
- Abbreviation: CFA
- Founded: 1978; 47 years ago
- Affiliation: All India Football Federation (AIFF)
- Regional affiliation: Tamil Nadu Football Association (TNFA)
- Headquarters: Chennai

Chennai Football Association (CFA) is a sports governing body that governs the football in and around the Chennai district of Tamil Nadu. It is a member of the Tamil Nadu Football Association, which is affiliated to the All India Football Federation (AIFF). The CFA organises Chennai Football League, overlooking promotion and development of football in the bustling city of Chennai. Chennai Football Association has 96 affiliated clubs and conducts about 450 league matches for its member clubs, dividing them to 4 senior divisions, apart from conducting league for the schools and colleges. St. Joseph's Group of Institutions was the principal sponsor for nine years.

== Competitions ==
=== Men ===
- Chennai Football League

== Chennai football pyramid ==
There are five divisions in the league under the Chennai Football Association (CFA), with the CFA Senior Division being the top-most league, followed by four lower tiers.

Chennai Football League
Tier	Division
1 _{(5 on Indian football pyramid)}	CFA Senior Division _{↑promote (to I-League 3) ↓relegate}
2 _{(6 on Indian football pyramid)}	CFA First Division _{↑promote ↓relegate}
3 _{(7 on Indian football pyramid)}	CFA Second Division _{↑promote ↓relegate}
4 _{(8 on Indian football pyramid)}	CFA Third Division _{↑promote ↓relegate}
5 _{(9 on Indian football pyramid)}	CFA Fourth Division _{↑promote}

== Football grounds ==
CFA conducts their events on the following grounds.

Ground	Location	Image
Jawaharlal Nehru Stadium (Chennai)	Chennai	
ICF Stadium	Ayanavaram	
