= Shelton Moses =

Personal information
- Born: 6 September 1984 (age 42) Pollachi, Coimbatore, Tamil Nadu
- Height: 200 cm (6 ft 7 in)
- Weight: 94 kg (207 lb)
- Spike: 350 cm (140 in)
- Block: 332 cm (131 in)

Volleyball information
- Position: Opposite/Blocker
- Current club: IOB
- Number: 14

National team
- Years: Team
- 2004 - Present: India

Shelton Moses currently plays for Chennai Spartans in the Pro Volleyball League.

== Early life ==
He started playing at school in Pollachi Tamil Nadu with the Red Star Volleyball Club. His height was the reason that the seniors at the club got me to join them. He went for a month-long summer camp, and when in class XI, He attended the trials for Thiruchirappallai Sports Hostel and got selected. In class XII, He got selected for Junior Nationals and the following year, He joined college at St Joseph, Thiruchirappallai.

== Professional life ==
He joined in Indian Overseas Bank in 2004 on sports quota. Coach Kalaiselvan played a key role in shaping his career through school and college. He participated in the Youth World Championship in 2004. He played for the first time with Senior India in 2007 at the Central Asia Cup in Pakistan and they won the gold medal, as well as the silver medal in the 2007 Commonwealth Championship. Playing in the Asian Championship in 2007 and the 2010 Rashid Memorial.
