= K. J. Kapil Dev =

Indian volleyball player

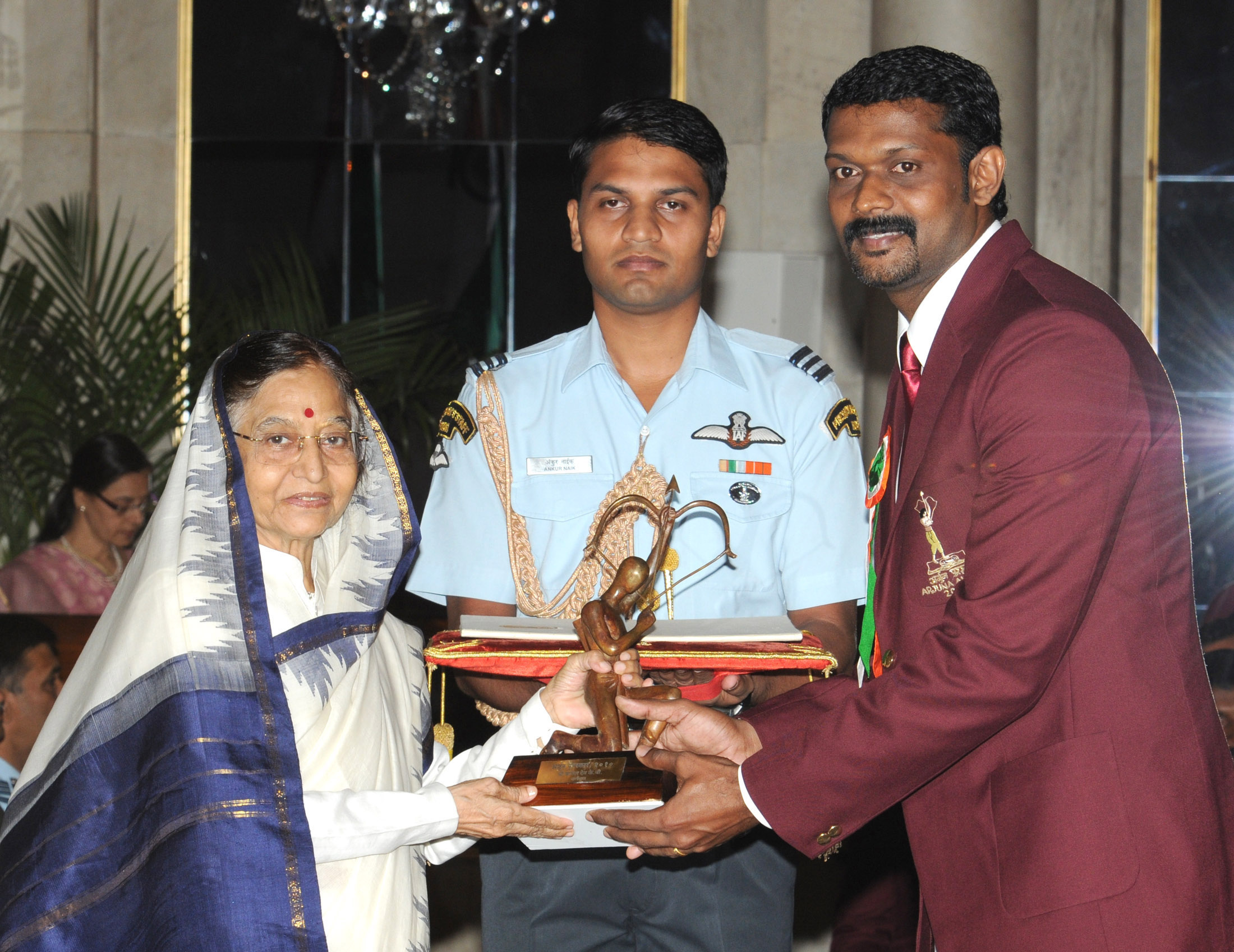
- President Pratibha Patil presenting the Arjuna Award-2010 to Shri K. J. Kapil Dev

Personal information
- Full name: K. J. Kapil Dev
- Born: Varkala, Trivandrum, India
- Height: 192 cm (6 ft 4 in)

Volleyball information
- Position: Right-handed Setter

National team
2006-2010	India men's national volleyball team

K. J. Kapil Dev is an Indian volleyball player from Varkala, Trivandrum. He represented India in many international competitions. Kapil also led the Indian National Volleyball Team on a number of occasions, including the Rashid Memorial International Volleyball Tournament held at Dubai in July 2006 and 15th Asian Games at Doha. He was also a member of Indian team that won the title in South Asian Games at Dhaka in 2010. At the national level championships, Kapil represents Indian Railways. He currently plays for Chennai Spartans in Pro Volleyball League.

Kapil employed with Indian railways, where he works in the Commercial Branch of the Divisional office in Thiruvananthapuram. Kapil Dev hails from Varkala in Thiruvananthapuram district. His wife Radhika is also a volleyball player in the Indian Railway Team. Kapil Dev has been selected for the Arjuna Award on 29 August 2010 for his contribution to Indian volleyball.
