= Chennai Spartans =

Indian volleyball team

- Founded: 2018
- Ground: Jawaharlal Nehru Indoor Stadium, Chennai (Capacity: 5000)
- Owner: Chennai Spartans Private Limited
- League: Pro Volleyball League (until 2021)
- Website: Club home page

Uniforms
Home	Away

Championships
- 1 (2019)

Chennai Spartans was a men's volleyball team from Chennai, Tamil Nadu playing in the Pro Volleyball League in India.

Chennai Spartans made to final after beating Kochi Blue Spikers in semi-finals in 2019 season. In finals, they beat Calicut Heroes to win their maiden title.

== Team ==
Team roster – Season 2019
Chennai Spartans
No.	Name	Position
2	(India) Naveen Raja Jacob	attacker
13	(India) Vibin M George	attacker
4	(Latvia) Ruslans Sorokins	attacker
12	(India) R Piraisoodan	attacker
5	(India) Shelton Moses(C)	blocker
7	(Canada) Rudy Verhoeff	blocker
8	(India) A. Bhagyaraj	blocker
9	(India) Akhin. G. S	blocker
12	(India) K. J. Kapil Dev	setter
14	(India) V. Hariharan	setter
11	(India) Prabhakaran Prabhakaran	libero
15	(India) Ashwin Raj	universal
Head coach: M. H. Kumara

Source :
