= Team Est Cola (men) =

Thailand volleyball club

Est Cola
- Flag of Thailand, used in the jersey uniform. The team is represented by the Est Cola soft drink brand logo.
- Full name: Team Est Cola
- Short name: Est Cola
- Founded: 2019
- Head coach: Monchai Supajirakul
- Captain: Kitsada Somkane

Team Est Cola (stylized as est or EST; Thai: ทีมเอสโคล่า) is a Thailand-based men's volleyball team named after the Thai cola soft drink of the same name. It represented Thailand in the 2019 Asian Men's Club Volleyball Championship in Taiwan.

== History ==
Thai Drinks Co the marketer of Est Cola which was produced by Sermsuk Plc has been sponsoring the national volleyball teams program of Thailand for both men and women since 2015.

The team took part at the 2019 Asian Men's Club Volleyball Championship in Taiwan. As champions of the 2018–19 Men's Volleyball Thailand League season, Air Force VC earned the right to represent Thailand in the international club competition. However due to conflicting player and staff commitments, Air Force withdrew from the competition.

Est Cola, replaced Air Force, which is a selection of players from the Thailand League. It also included some players from Air Force. Est Cola finished 10th place.

== 2019 Asian Club Championship roster ==
Head coach: Monchai Supajirakul

Name	Original club
Mawin Maneewong	Air Force
Narongrit Janpirom	Phitsanulok
Kitsada Somkane	Visakha
Anut Promchan	Phitsanulok
Chakkrit Chandahuadong	Nakhon Ratchasima The Mall
Kittithad Nuwaddee	Phitsanulok
Kissada Nilsawai	Air Force
Anuchit Pakdeekaew	Air Force
Prasert Pinkaew	Phitsanulok
Aekkawee Bangsri	Phitsanulok
Pusit Phonarin	Air Force
Jakraprop Saengsee	Air Force
Jakkapong Tongklang	Visakha
Montri Puanglib	Diamond Food
