= Tamil Nadu Football Association =

Indian state football association

- Sport: Football
- Jurisdiction: Tamil Nadu
- Membership: 38 district association
- Abbreviation: TNFA
- Founded: 1934; 91 years ago (as Madras Football Association)
- Affiliation: All India Football Federation (AIFF)
- Headquarters: Chennai
- President: Shanmugam S.

The Tamil Nadu Football Association (also known as Tamilnadu; abbreviated as TNFA), formerly the Madras Football Association, is one of the 36 Indian state football associations that are affiliated with the All India Football Federation. The TNFA administers football in the Indian state of Tamil Nadu. It sends state teams for the Santosh Trophy and the Rajmata Jijabai Trophy.

== History ==
The first football tournament in Madras was held in 1894 with 10 teams from all over the country. From the year 1895, the Madras Gymkhana Club hosted an annual tournament. The winning team gets the EK Chetty Cup. Regimental units like Queens Own Regiment, Lancashire Fusiliers, 2nd Battalion the Dorsetshire Regiment, and 5th Field Battery - Royal Regiment of Artillery participated in the tournament. The EK Chetty Cup was won by regimental teams till 1933. The Pachaiyappa High School became the first Indian and non-military team to win it. The South Indian Athletic Association instituted the Jatprole Cup tournament.

Madras Football Association was formed on 5 January 1934, following drafting of the constitution on 26 October 1933, with jurisdiction for the whole state of Madras, including the present Andhra and Kerala states, by the members of the Madras United Club. Madras Football Association league championship was started in 1934. Pachaiyappa's football club won the inaugural 1934–35 league championship. The MFA started conducting the First division league from 1936, and the Second division from 1937. In the year of 1978, Madras clubs formed a separate Chennai Football Association, eventually renaming the state federation as the Tamil Nadu Football Association.

N. Vittal served as the president of Tamil Nadu Football Association. He also served as the vice-president of the AIFF. T. R. Govindarajan served as the secretary of the TNFA. Some of the tournaments conducted by the TNFA are the Tamil Nadu State League, Vittal Trophy, Champions Trophy - Universal Cup, and TFA Shield. At present, all these three tournaments are not conducted. The major leagues in the Tamil Nadu happen in districts like Chennai and Madurai. Chennai district league (Chennai Super League) is conducted by the Chennai Football Association (CFA), and Madurai district league by the Madurai District Football Association. The Tiruvallur District Football Association conducted the Don Bosco - Fr. McFerran Trophy All India football tournament sanctioned by the Tamil Nadu Football Association and the AIFF.

== State teams ==
=== Men ===
- Tamil Nadu football team
- Tamil Nadu under-20 football team
- Tamil Nadu under-15 football team
- Tamil Nadu under-13 football team

=== Women ===
- Tamil Nadu women's football team
- Tamil Nadu women's under-19 football team
- Tamil Nadu women's under-17 football team

== Affiliated district associations ==
All 38 districts of Tamil Nadu are affiliated with the Tamil Nadu Football Association.

No.	Association	District	President
1	Ariyalur District Football Association	Ariyalur	
2	Chengalpattu District Football Association	Chengalpattu	
3	Chennai Football Association	Chennai	
4	Coimbatore district Football Association	Coimbatore	
5	Cuddalore district Football Association	Cuddalore	
6	Dharmapuri district Football Association	Dharmapuri	
7	Dindigul district Football Association	Dindigul	
8	Erode district Football Association	Erode	
9	Kallakurichi district Football Association	Kallakurichi	
10	Kancheepuram district Football Association	Kancheepuram	
11	Kanyakumari district Football Association	Kanyakumari	
12	Karur district Football Association	Karur	
13	Krishnagiri district Football Association	Krishnagiri	
14	Madurai district Football Association	Madurai	
15	Mayiladuthurai district Football Association	Mayiladuthurai	
16	Nagapattinam district Football Association	Nagapattinam	
17	Namakkal district Football Association	Namakkal	
18	Nilgiris district Football Association	Nilgiris	
19	Perambalur district Football Association	Perambalur	
20	Pudukkottai district Football Association	Pudukkottai	
21	Ramanathapuram district Football Association	Ramanathapuram	
22	Ranipet district Football Association	Ranipet	
23	Salem district Football Association	Salem	
24	Sivaganga district Football Association	Sivaganga	
25	Tenkasi district Football Association	Tenkasi	
26	Thanjavur district Football Association	Thanjavur	
27	Theni district Football Association	Theni	
28	Thoothukudi district Football Association	Thoothukudi	
29	Tiruchirappalli district Football Association	Tiruchirappalli	
30	Tirunelveli district Football Association	Tirunelveli	
31	Tirupathur district Football Association	Tirupathur	
32	Tiruppur district Football Association	Tiruppur	
33	Tiruvallur district Football Association	Tiruvallur	
34	Tiruvannamalai district Football Association	Tiruvannamalai	
35	Tiruvarur district Football Association	Tiruvarur	
36	Vellore district Football Association	Vellore	
37	Viluppuram district Football Association	Viluppuram	
38	Virudhunagar district Football Association	Virudhunagar	

== Competitions ==
=== Club level ===
==== Men's ====
- Chennai Football League
- Tamil Nadu State League
- TFA Shield
- Vittal Trophy

==== Women's ====
- Tamil Nadu Women's League

== Tamil Nadu Football League pyramid ==
Chennai Football League
Tier	Division
1 _{(Level 5 on Indian football pyramid)}	CFA Senior Division _{↑promote (I-League 3) ↓relegate}
2 _{(Level 6 on Indian football pyramid)}	CFA First Division _{↑promote ↓relegate}
3 _{(Level 7 on Indian football pyramid)}	CFA Second Division _{↑promote ↓relegate}
4 _{(Level 8 on Indian football pyramid)}	CFA Third Division _{↑promote ↓relegate}
5 _{(Level 9 on Indian football pyramid)}	CFA Fourth Division _{↑promote}

== See also ==
- Football in India
