= Jawaharlal Nehru Stadium (Chennai) =

Multipurpose stadium in Chennai, India

- Marina Arena
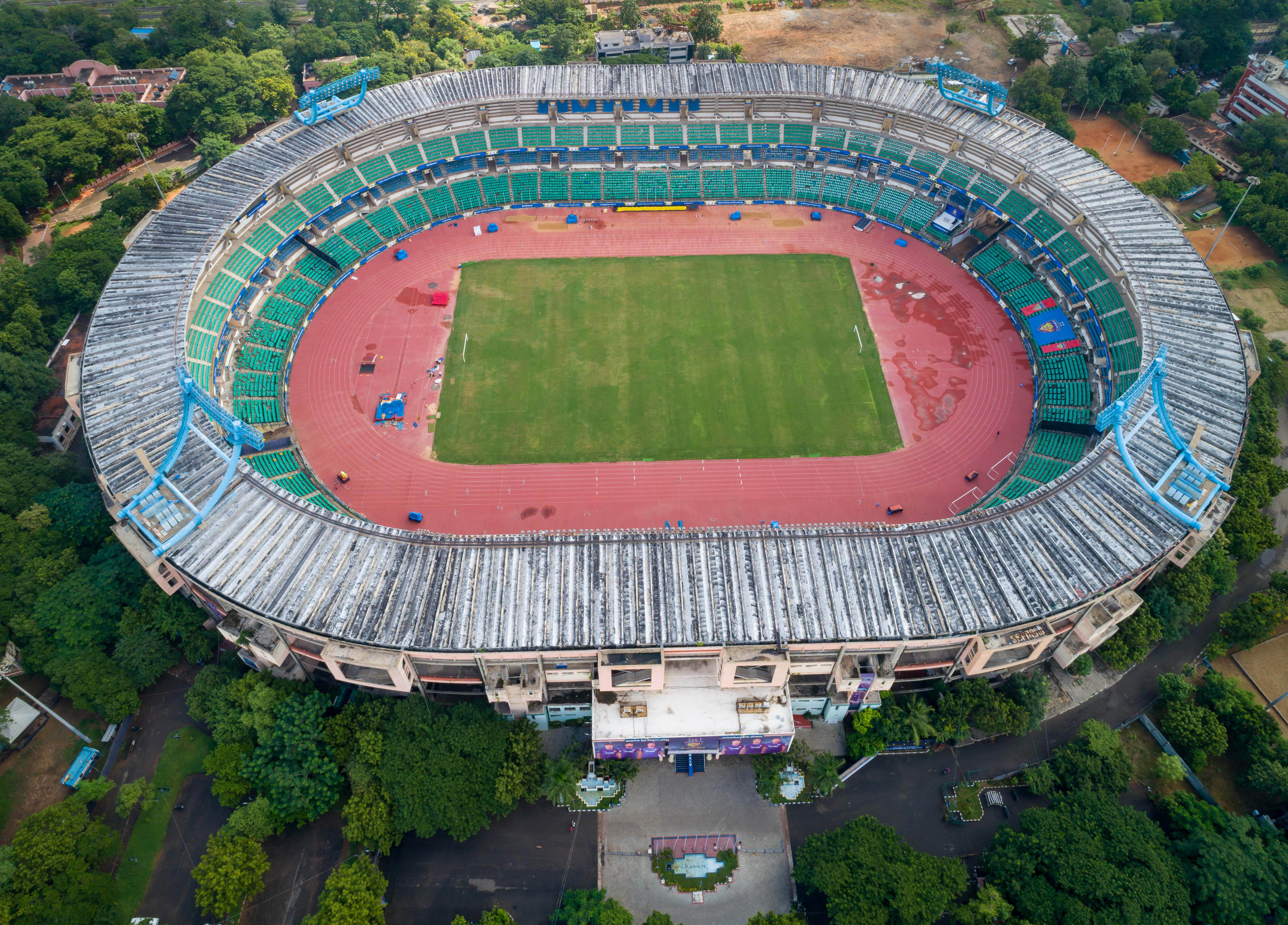
- Aerial view of the stadium
- Interactive map of Jawaharlal Nehru Stadium
- Location: Chennai, India
- Coordinates: 13°05′08″N 80°16′18″E
- Owner: Government of Tamil Nadu
- Operator: Government of Tamil Nadu
- Capacity: 40,000
- Surface: Grass
- Public transit: Chennai Central; Chennai Park Town; Moore Market Complex

Construction
- Opened: 1993
- General contractor: Larsen & Toubro

Tenants
- Tamil Nadu football team Tamil Nadu women's football team Chennaiyin FC (2014–present); Sethu FC (2024–present); Tamil Thalaivas (2017–present); Indian national cricket team (1956-1965); Chennai City FC (2016-2020)

Jawaharlal Nehru Stadium is a multi-purpose stadium in Chennai, Tamil Nadu. The stadium is located at Sydenhams road in Park Town, besides the Chennai Central suburban railway station. It has a seating capacity of 40,000.

In 1946, the Corporation Stadium was built in a portion of the land occupied by the People's Park in Central Madras. The stadium hosted nine test cricket matches between 1956 and 1965. The stadium was refurbished in 1993 and was named after India's first prime minister Jawaharlal Nehru. It hosted the 1993 Nehru Cup, 1995 South Asian Games, and other international football matches in the late 1990s.

The stadium is used to mostly host football matches and athletic competitions. It is used by the Tamil Nadu football team and the Tamil Nadu women's football team for playing its official home matches. Indian Super League team Chennaiyin FC and Indian Women's League team Sethu FC also use the stadium as their home ground. The stadium is sometimes used for hosting functions and other events like music concerts.

The complex also houses an indoor stadium with a seating capacity of 8,000 built in 1995. It has a skating rink and facilities to host other indoor sports. The Pro Kabaddi League team Tamil Thalaivas play their home matches at the indoor complex.

== History ==
In 1946, the Corporation stadium was built on a portion of land occupied by the People's Park in Central Chennai. It had a capacity of 20,000 and consisted of six cricket pitches with field hockey and football fields on either side surrounded by a 30 ft (9.1 m) wide athletics track. The stadium was used to host sport matches and other official events such as the parade during Mountbatten's visit to Madras in 1946. It hosted nine test cricket matches from 1956 to 1965.

In the early 1990s, C. R. Viswanathan, then the Secretary of the Tamil Nadu Football Association, approached the then Chief Minister of Tamil Nadu Jayalalithaa with a plan to refurbish the old Corporation stadium into new modern facility. The stadium was refurbished in 1992 in a span of 234 days, at a cost of ₹440 million (US$4.6 million) and the capacity was expanded to 40,000. It was named after India's first prime minister Jawaharlal Nehru. The stadium hosted the Nehru Cup international football tournament in January-February 1993. It later hosted the football matches at the 1995 South Asian Games, and other international matches.

An indoor stadium with a capacity of 8,000 was added at a cost of ₹200 million (US$2.1 million) in 1995. In 1998, the indoor stadium hosted the World Volleyball Grand Prix tournament. In 2012-13, the Government of Tamil Nadu renovated the stadium at a cost of ₹178.06 million (US$1.8 million). The indoor stadium was refurbished at a cost of ₹120 million (US$1.2 million) and added a new skating rink. A new synthetic athletics track, new football turf, and floodlights were added, and new accommodations were constructed. A new warm-up facility was constructed to the north of the stadium at a cost of ₹331 million (US$3.4 million). The stadium underwent further renovation in 2023 before it served as the host of the fifth Khelo India Youth Games in January 2024.

== Facilities ==
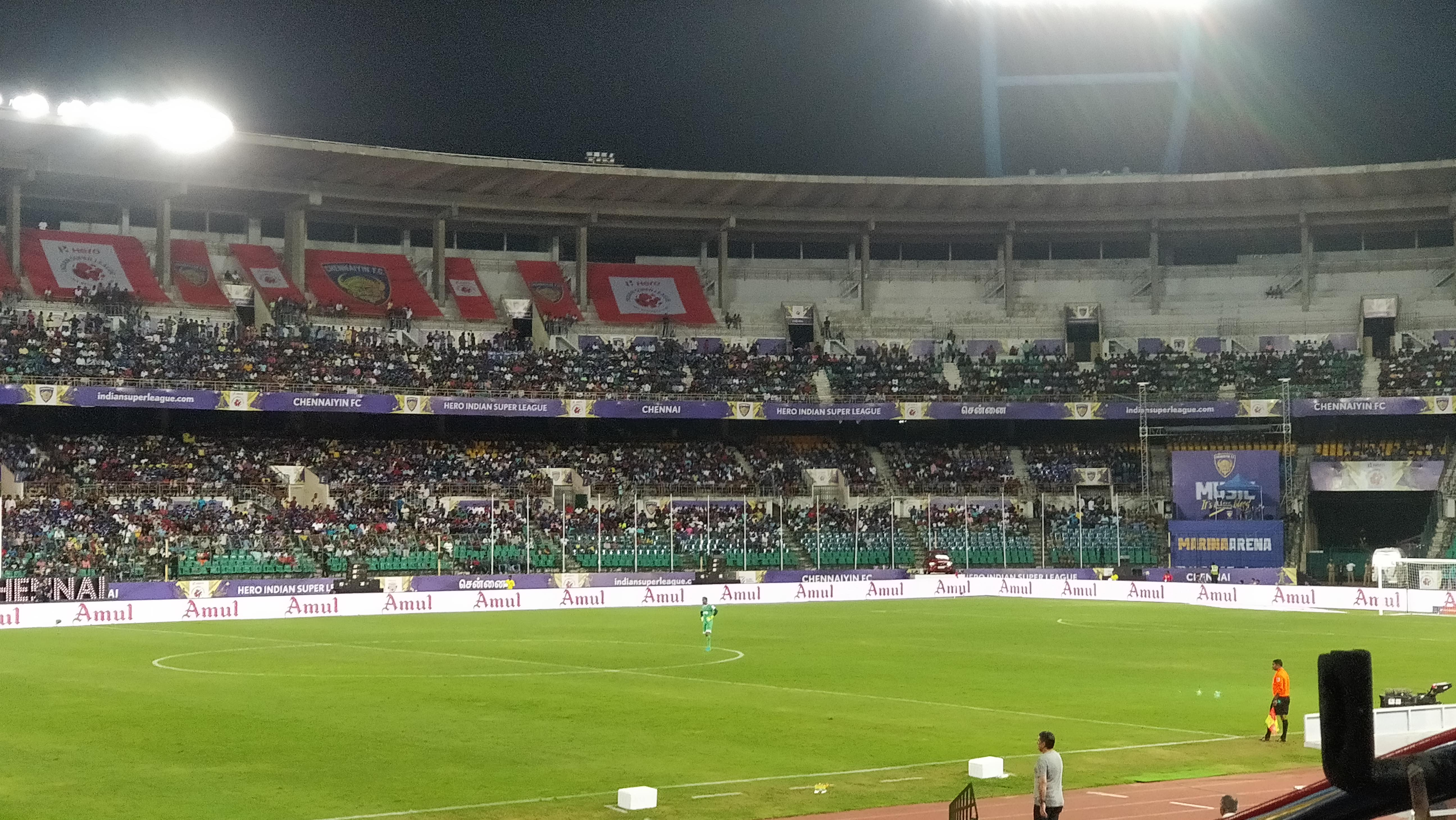
The Stadium in 2017

The stadium has a natural football turf surrounded by a 400 m (1,300 ft) eight lane synthetic athletics track and a seating capacity of 40,000. The indoor complex has a seating capacity of 8,000 and is used to host several indoor sports. There are two concrete basketball courts, two beach volleyball courts, three clay volleyball courts, one throw ball court, a roller rink, a handball court, a fencing hall, a boxing ring, and a kabaddi field. There are also facilities for judo, weightlifting, table tennis, chess, and carrom besides a fitness center and a conference hall. The indoor complex can also be re-configured to hosts functions and concerts.

== Notable records ==
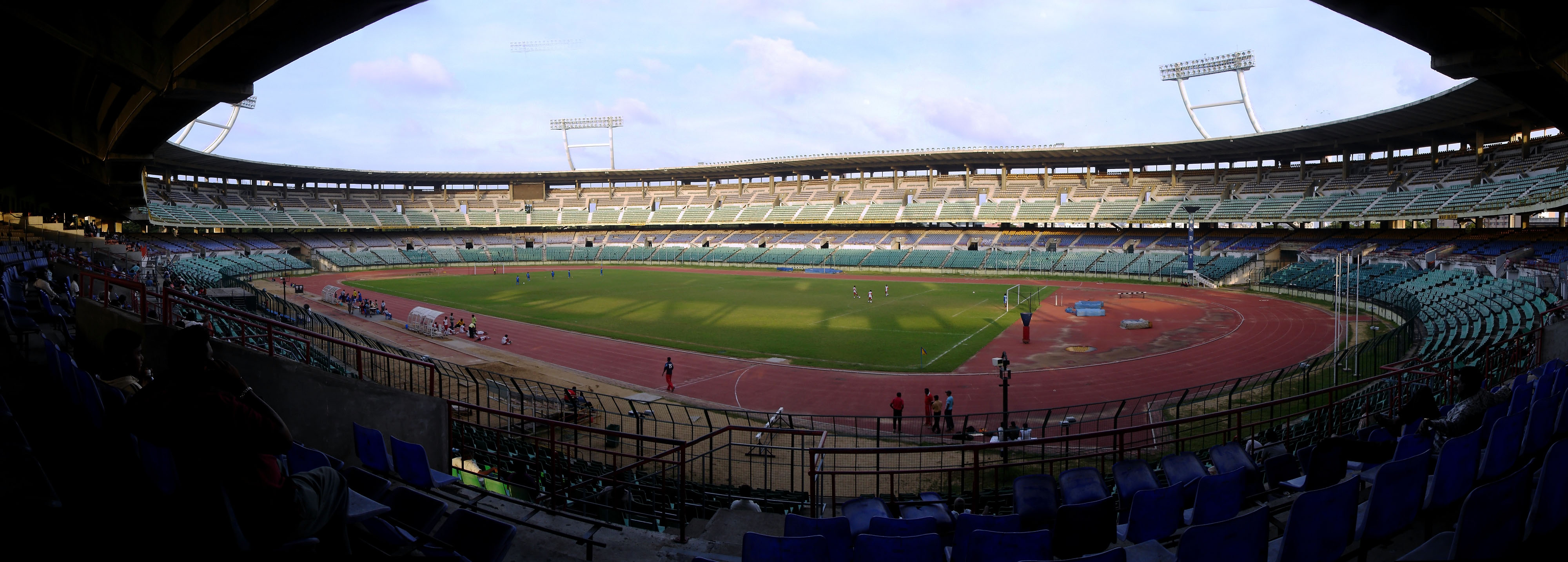
Panoramic view of the stadium

In 1953, Vinoo Mankad and Pankaj Roy were involved in a 413-run partnership for the first wicket against New Zealand in 1956, a test cricket record which remained unbroken till 2008 and still remains the second highest till date. The Indian national cricket team won its first test series against England in 1962 after winning the fifth and final test match of the series at the venue.

== See also ==
- List of football stadiums in India
- List of stadiums in India
